Pokémon, known in Japan as , is a Japanese anime television series based on the Pokémon video game series published by Nintendo. It began broadcasting on TV Tokyo on April 1, 1997, in association with MediaNet (formerly TV Tokyo MediaNet and Softx) and Shopro, stands for Shogakukan-Shueisha Productions Co., Ltd. (formerly Shogakukan Productions Co., Ltd.). The show's central protagonist is Ash Ketchum, a ten-year-old aspiring "Pokémon master", who participates in competitions involving battles with creatures called Pokémon in the fictional regions of Kanto, the Orange Islands, Johto, Hoenn, Sinnoh, Unova, Kalos, Alola and Galar. Ash is usually joined by his electric mouse partner Pikachu and a regularly changing line-up of human friends. These friends are Misty, Brock, Tracey Sketchit, May, Max, Dawn, Iris, Cilan, Serena, Clemont, Bonnie, Lana, Kiawe, Lillie, Sophocles, Mallow and Goh.

Main antagonists of Ash and his friends throughout the show are the frequently comedic, greedy thieves from Team Rocket, made up of the humans Jessie and James, a talking Meowth and later, a Wobbuffet. Ash also competes with a number of recurring rival Pokémon trainers in his journeys, including Gary Oak, Ritchie, Harrison, Morrison, Tyson, Paul, Nando, Conway, Barry, Tobias, Trip, Bianca, Stephan, Cameron, Virgil, Tierno, Trevor, Sawyer, Alain, Gladion, Hau and Bea.

Protagonists

Voiced by (English): Veronica Taylor (4Kids); Sarah Natochenny (TPCI)Voiced by (Japanese): Rika Matsumoto; Hana Takeda (young, JN001)
Ash Ketchum is the main protagonist of the Pokémon anime. A 10-year-old Pokémon trainer, his dream is to become the Pokémon Master. He is loosely based on Red, the protagonist of the games Pokémon Red and Blue. In the series, Ash competed in Pokémon Leagues in Kanto, Johto, Hoenn, Sinnoh, Unova, Kalos and Alola and also competed in the Battle Frontier in Kanto. Ash is currently the Alola Champion and World Champion referred as Monarch. He possesses a Z-Power Ring, a Dynamax Band, a Key Stone for Mega Evolution and received a Lucarionite to Mega Evolve his Lucario.

Voiced by (English): Rachael Lillis (4Kids), Michele Knotz (TPCI)Voiced by (Japanese): Mayumi Iizuka
Misty is Ash's first ever traveling companion, She is a 10-year-old Pokémon trainer who journeys with him throughout the Original series. She is a huge fan of water type Pokémon and is recognised as a World Class Water Type Gym Leader. She was one of the four gym leaders of Cerulean City along with her three older sisters, and after the Original series Misty has been recognised as the Sole Gym Leader of Cerulean City Gym. Her dream is to be the world's greatest "Water Pokémon Master". Misty has a different personality from other companions of Ash. She is not too girly, she was too arrogant to her companions in the beginning and that behaviour slowly began to deteriorate as the series went on. Misty is brave, courageous and accepts the harsh realities of life. She is a constant support to Ash and has saved him from both death and paralysis, even though they both argue over the smallest of matters. During the beginning of the series, she is constantly belittled by her older sisters. At the end of the original series, she takes over the Cerulean Gym. Misty along with Brock has had made a huge impact on both the Franchise and its audience. Misty is also known as an occasional performer of the Cerulean City Gym. She is also known as "The Tomboyish Mermaid". Unlike other female companions Misty was the only companion to leave Ash without will. Misty appeared as guest in the Advanced Generation and Sun & Moon, where it is revealed that Misty also owns a Mega Gyarados and she appears in flashbacks in Pokémon: Battle Frontier as well as a flashback and a fantasy in two of the Pokémon: Adventures in Unova and Beyond episodes and as a silhouette in Journeys. Misty returned in person later on where she watched Ash's match against Leon and later met Goh and his Inteleon. Later, she runs into Ash again and defeats him in a battle for possession of a Clauncher, before deciding to travel again with Ash.

Voiced by (English): Eric Stuart (4Kids), Bill Rogers (TPCI)Voiced by (Japanese): Yūji Ueda
Brock is a 15-year-old Pokémon Doctor in training, the former Pewter City Gym Leader and the ladies' man. In his earliest appearances, Brock has dreams of being the world's best Pokémon Breeder but later changed his dream to become a Pokémon Doctor. There is a running gag in the series where Brock falls in love with every girl he meets and is either pulled away by the ear by Misty or Max or is hit with Croagunk's Poison Jab, temporarily knocking him unconscious. Brock leaves the main cast at the end of the Diamond and Pearl series to become a Pokémon Doctor. Like Misty, Brock had guest appearances in the Sun & Moon season, where it is revealed that he has a Mega Steelix. He also appeared as a silhouette and in a flashback in an episode of Pokémon Master Journeys as well as three episodes of the Arceus Chronicles, as well as listening to Team Rocket's radio station and watching Ash's match against Leon in Ultimate Journeys. He later reunites with Ash, Misty and Cilan while dealing with a troublesome Hatterene. Afterwards, Brock resumes travelling with Ash and Misty while parting ways with Cilan.

Voiced by (English): Ted Lewis (4Kids), Craig Blair (TPCI)Voiced by (Japanese): Tomokazu Seki
One of Ash's traveling friends in Orange Islands, Tracey Sketchit is a Pokémon watcher, and assistant to Professor Oak in Pallet Town. He replaces Brock as a primary character in Adventures in the Orange Islands, with guest appearances in seasons 5, 8, and 9. He has made a few non speaking cameos in Diamond and Pearl and Black and White and in a fantasy in "The Dream Continues" as he was visiting Misty in Cerulean City, as well as being mentioned in Journeys, looking for Ash's Infernape and later physically reappearing in the Masters Eight arc watching Ash's battles against Steven Stone, Cynthia and Leon.

Voiced by (English): Veronica Taylor (4Kids), Michele Knotz (TPCI)Voiced by (Japanese): Kaori Suzuki
May is the daughter of the Petalburg City Gym Leader, Norman and the older sister of Max. She meets Ash Ketchum in Advanced Generation and starts traveling with him after obtaining her first Pokémon, Torchic. Initially, May didn't like Pokémon as she only wanted to start her journey for the adventure and freedom that came with traveling with a Pokémon. However, her encounter with Ash and Brock changed that and her love for Pokémon began to grow steadily. She takes interest in Pokémon Contests, entering Contests with Pokémon she raises on her team. After entering contests, she goes on to win many contests. May travels through Hoenn and Kanto with Ash and Brock whilst Ash is competing in the Hoenn League and Battle Frontier, respectively. Eventually, her Torchic evolves into a Combusken, which later evolves into a Blaziken. While Ash and Brock choose to travel to Sinnoh, May does not accompany them as she went to compete in Johto. However, she visits Ash, Brock and Dawn in Sinnoh to participate in the Wallace Cup. She is known as the "Princess of Hoenn", an alias by which Dawn refers her when the two first meet. She only appears in a fantasy in Black and White series and in Journeys, before returning to the show after a long absence, watching Ash's win against Leon.

Voiced by (English): Amy Birnbaum (4Kids); Kayzie Rogers (TPCI)Voiced by (Japanese): Fushigi Yamada
Max is the 7-year-old son of the Petalburg City Gym Leader, Norman and the younger brother of May. He joins the group of Ash, May and Brock. Max is a budding Pokémon trainer, but is too young to receive a Pokémon. He is a bookworm who has read just about everything written about Pokémon. He remains a Pokémon enthusiast until he and May leave Ash and Brock at the end of Advanced Generation, in which he returns to Hoenn to help take care of the Petalburg Gym. He is again seen as a flashback in DP Battle Dimension. Max has received just two cameos since his departure, due to May's brief return for the Wallace Cup arc. He also appears in a flashback in DP Galactic Battles and a fantasy in Black and White series and appears in Journeys, after a long absence, where it is revealed he is accompanying May while she is competing in Contests.

Voiced by (English): Emily BauerVoiced by (Japanese): Megumi Toyoguchi
Dawn is a Pokémon Coordinator who travels with Ash and Brock in Sinnoh. Following in her mother's footsteps as a Coordinator, she chooses Piplup, who she had already befriended at an earlier point, and sets out with the goal of becoming Top Coordinator. As a native of Sinnoh, she often explains certain aspects of the region unfamiliar to both Ash and Brock, and keeps up to date with popular trends like the Pokétch. As she participates and win in more Contests, Dawn gradually becomes more confident in her skills as a Coordinator and regularly trains with her Pokémon before every contest. Although she originally planned to participate in the Kanto contests, she decides to remain in Sinnoh when her Buneary is offered to model for a Pokémon magazine. Dawn is saddened to leave Ash and Brock, but she and Piplup cheer up and wave goodbye as they return to Kanto. She later decides to travel to Hoenn to take part in the contests there in the special episode of Diamond and Pearl. Dawn met up with Ash and his Unova companions to compete at the Pokémon World Tournament Junior Cup. After this, she left for Johto to compete in the Wallace Cup being held there. Dawn later returns in Pokémon Journeys with the help of Goh and Ash to save Cresselia and Darkrai from Team Rocket, as well as investigate the disappearance of the Pokemon in the Sinnoh region, while encountering Dialga and Palkia again and appears in four of Arceus Chronicles episodes and in a fantasy in an episode of Journeys. She watched Ash's battle against Leon in person alongside Chloe.

Voiced by (English): Eileen Stevens(Season 14-Season 24), Anairis Quiñones (Current)Voiced by (Japanese): Aoi Yūki 
One of Ash's companions in Black and White series. Hailing from a village where there are many Dragon-type Pokémon, Iris is a Pokémon trainer who swings from vines and likes to eat berries. She first meets Ash when he mistakes her for a Pokémon. She tends to call Ash a kid, usually when Ash makes a mistake or acts particularly naïve. She has the Dragon-type Pokémon Axew as her companion. She reappeared in the 65th episode of Pokémon Journeys: The Series, but in the same outfit as she appears in Pokémon Black 2 and White 2 (she initially appeared in the outfit she wore back when Ash travelled with her, when Goh mistook her for a Pokémon). In her reappearance, it is revealed that her Axew evolved all the way into a Haxorus, has been training and battling Dragon-type trainers such as Clair (the Blackthorn City Gym Leader) before returning home. She reunites with Ash while battling him in the Opelucid Gym. This episode, "Thrash of the Titans!", was to serve as an apology to fans for not letting Ash do the Opelucid Gym in the Black and White series and for failing to evolve Axew within his debut series. She is also revealed to be the new Unova League Champion (like in Pokémon Black 2 and White 2), confirming that Alder no longer holds the title (having defeated him off-screen). While she does put up a good fight, she loses to Ash, causing her rank in the World Coronation series to drop. However, it is revealed that she is  member of the Masters Eight. This is also the first time Ash wins against a regional Champion (though Iris doesn't lose her title, like in the games). Iris battled Cynthia, who mentored her during the Black and White series, only to lose, although she managed to put up a good fight while leaving a nice impression from her. Although Iris stayed behind to watch Ash's match against Steven Stone, she went back home to Unova but got to watch Ash's battle against Leon on her tablet computer.

Voiced by (English): Jason GriffithVoiced by (Japanese): Mamoru Miyano
Cilan is an A-Class Pokémon Connoisseur who has the ability to determine the compatibility between Pokémon and their trainers. He travels with Ash in Black and White series. He is also one of the Gym Leaders of the Unova Region, a position he shares with his brothers Chili and Cress, but he leaves his post to join Ash and Iris on their journey. He has numerous hobbies seen throughout the series such as fishing, cinema and subway trains. He considers himself a good detective and is skeptical about anything that there isn't an immediate logical explanation for. He has the Grass-type Pokémon Pansage as his partner, alongside Crustle and Stunfisk. He is a sort of mentor/supporting figure to Ash and Iris. He reappears in the special episode of Pokémon: XYZ and also in a flashback in an episode of Pokémon Journeys. He eventually makes a guest appearance in the show watching Ash's win against Leon. Later, he meets up with Ash again at Galar while meeting Misty for the first time, as well as help saving Brock from a troublesome Hatterene. While Brock went to travel with Ash and Misty, Cilan parted ways with the three.

Voiced by (English): Haven Burton-PaschallVoiced by (Japanese): Mayuki Makiguchi
Serena is a 10-year-old Pokémon Performer. She fell in love with Ash when the two of them attended the Oak summer camp in Pallet Town. During this time, Serena had fallen and injured her leg and Ash then helped her with her injury and she starts to have a crush on him. After learning that Ash is in Kalos, she decides to leave home to reunite him, and upon doing so comes along with him on his journey without having a specified goal. After experiencing numerous events like the Sycamore summer camp, she learns about Pokémon Showcases from Shauna and decides to become a Pokémon Performer. Following a heartbreaking loss in her debut Showcase, she cuts her hair and begins wearing a new outfit. After obtaining three Princess Keys, she competes in the Gloire City Master Class Showcase, ultimately going one-on-one with Kalos Queen Aria, whom she is unsuccessful in defeating. Once the Kalos league and Team Flare crisis comes to an end, Serena ponders on future plans. After encouragement from Ash, she prepares to compete in the Pokémon contests that occur in Hoenn. Before parting, she gives Ash a kiss and confessed her feelings for him. Throughout the anime, she can be jealous when another girl seemingly flirts with Ash or tries to take him away from her (most notably her rival Miette). She is the only one of Ash's female companions to not get shocked by his Pikachu. She returned in the 15th episode of Pokémon Ultimate Journeys: The Series, where she encouraged Chloe to perform at the Lilycove City Pokémon Contest by giving her the exact same words that Ash said to Serena throughout her journey with him. She tied with Lisia for the number one spot. Her Braixen has since evolved into a Delphox. Just before Ash, Chloe, and Goh departed for Vermillion City, she briefly reunited with Ash where they both shared their respective goals to each other. She also promised to support Ash in World Coronation Series and does so by watching Ash's match against Leon.

Voiced by (English): Michael Liscio Jr.Voiced by (Japanese): Yūki Kaji
Clemont is Bonnie's older brother. He is an Electric-type Gym Leader from the Lumiose City Gym. He is a young inventor and always has a large backpack that contains numerous strange gadgets, most of which explode. Clemont drags Bonnie off with his Aipom Arm out of embarrassment when she asks some girl to marry him, instead of the other way around. In his early life, Clemont attended an academy studying Electric-type Pokémon. While coming up with a project prior to graduation, he befriended a wild Shinx and later created an electric recharge station. Although he graduated, he and Shinx had a falling out due to the mayor taking Clemont to a special banquet. Fortunately, years later, Clemont made up with his Shinx (now as a Luxio). Out of intense admiration for Ash, he travels with him during XY series to become a better Gym Leader. This culminates when Ash challenges and successfully defeats Clemont at the Lumiose Gym, acquiring his fifth badge in Kalos. Before Ash leaves Kalos, he asks for one final battle with Ash. He is a bit different from previous male companions, in that Ash is a sort of mentor figure to him, not the other way around, like Brock and Cilan. He returns in Ultimate Journeys alongside Bonnie reuniting with Ash and meeting Goh. Clemont helps Ash train both his Sirfetch'd and Dracovish for his upcoming World Coronation Series Ultra Class match against the Kalos Elite Four member Drasna and later watches Ash's battle against Drasna where Ash emerged victorious. It's also revealed that his Bunnelby evolved into a Diggersby. Later, he and Bonnie watched Ash's match against Leon.

Voiced by (English): Alyson Leigh RosenfeldVoiced by (Japanese): Mariya Ise (EP803-887, 903–942); Mika Kanai (EP888-902)
Bonnie is a Pokémon trainer-to-be and Clemont's younger sister. Owing to being underage, her Pokémon nominally belongs to Clemont for now. Bonnie is often seen with a Dedenne, caught by Clemont. She cared for one of the Zygarde Cores in Pokemon XYZ until it combined with the other Zygarde Cores to become Zygarde Complete Forme and the penultimate episode. Before Ash's battle against Wulfric, she was the one who coined the term "Ash-Greninja", the form that Greninja assumes while being synchronized with Ash. She returns in Ultimate Journeys alongside Clemont, reuniting with Ash and meeting Goh, as well as watching Ash's match against Drasna. She also watched Ash's match against Leon.

Voiced by (English): Rosie ReyesVoiced by (Japanese): Hitomi Kikuchi
Lana is one of the students at the Pokémon School of Melemele Island who befriends Ash in Sun and Moon series. She is a master in fishing and loves Water-type Pokémon. Lana has a caring relationship with her two Pokémon partners which is a Popplio that she rescued from some Team Skull Grunts as it evolved into Brionne later on then evolves again into Primarina and she also owns a Eevee with bangs that were covering its eyes before she eventually cuts them off along with nicknaming it . Lana lives on a seaside house with her parents and little sisters, Harper and Sarah. While Lana is usually quiet, she is actually a girl of action. Lana is generally kind and caring to Pokémon. Lana likes to scares her friends with haunted stories. In addition, she sometimes even jokes about having seen or caught a rare Pokémon in the sea. Lana finds a Sparkling Stone during a treasure hunt on Akala Island which is later made into a Z-Ring for her and a Waterium Z from a Totem Wishiwashi after she wins a battle against it. She made a couple guest appearance in Pokémon Journeys. She later watched Ash's battle against Leon.

Voiced by (English): Marc SwintVoiced by (Japanese): Kaito Ishikawa
Among the students at the Pokémon School of Melemele Island who befriends Ash in Sun and Moonseries, Kiawe is the oldest and most experienced, being the only among them to have cleared Akala Island grand trial to be entrusted with a Z-Ring along with Firium Z that once belonged to his grandfather, becoming the first member of the group who can use Z-Moves. Kiawe owns a Turtonator also he owns an Alolan Marowak which he caught in "A Crowning Moment of Truth!" as their his trusted Pokémon partners. He runs a dairy farm on Akala Island along with his parents, and also has a little sister called Mimo, whom he dotes on. He specializes in Fire-type Pokémon, due to being inspired by his grandfather's words. Kiawe's family runs a farm on Akala Island, so he helps out there while also attending school. As the most senior in the class, Kiawe is a serious person. When he is home he tends to be overprotective of his younger sister. He is also serious when it goes to old traditions, especially with the Z-Ring and the Z-Crystals. When he first sees Ash with the Z-Ring, he shows signs of disapproval, since Ash gets it without completing the challenges. When Ash misplaces a Z-Crystal, he becomes enraged and threatens to send his Turtonator at him. It seems that Kiawe doesn't know how to interact with Water-type Pokémon, as he admits that he wasn't sure of how to deal with Popplio at first, instead having his sister play with it instead. In "When Regions Collide!", Kiawe is shown to be competitive when he challenges Brock to a real Gym battle at the Cerulean City Gym by using his Turtonator against his Steelix. But after being defeated by Brock and before departed in Alola, Kiawe develops a friendly rivalry with him. He made a guest appearance and appeared in a fantasy in an episode of Pokémon Journeys. Later on, he then challenges Ash into a friendly Battle Royale Match only to lose to Ash. Kiawe later watched Ash's battle against Leon.

Voiced by (English): Laurie HymesVoiced by (Japanese): Kei Shindō
Lillie is one of the students at the Pokémon School of Melemele Island who befriends Ash in Sun and Moon series. Hailing from a very rich family, she loves to study and usually helps the other students with their researches, but somehow has an inherent fear of touching any kind of Pokémon. Four years before her appearance in the series, she somehow developed her a fear of touching Pokémon during a travel with her mother Lusamine and brother Gladion, but slowly learns to overcome it in the series, getting used with an Alolan Vulpix nicknamed  she raises from egg before becoming her partner Pokémon, along with other Pokémon. However, after seeing one of her brother's Pokémon, Silvally, it triggers a part of her childhood trauma which causes her to not be able to touch Pokémon again. Her fear later ends when she realizes that Silvally was protecting her from an Ultra Beast called Nihilego, rather than attacking her. Later, after helping some wild Alolan Sandshrew deal with a Tyranitar, the leader Sandshrew evolves into a Sandslash and gives her an Icium Z. She keeps an Ice Stone given to her by Sophocles in the hope that Snowy will use it to evolve one day. Later, Lillie obtained her father's Z-Ring which she is holding onto until he was found. She is also one of the few female characters who enjoys Brock's company. She appeared in a flashback in an episode of Pokémon Journeys, where she was seen writing a letter to her friends while on a train in search of her lost father, Mohn. Along with Gladion and Lusamine, she returns to the show in person where she reunites with Mohn at Crown Tundra. Afterwards, the family alongside Ash, Goh and Chloe head off to Alola for their homecoming and Ash's Battle Royale match. She later watch Ash's battle against Leon.

Voiced by (English): Alyson Leigh RosenfeldVoiced by (Japanese): Fumiko Takekuma
Sophocles is one of the students at the Pokémon School of Melemele Island who befriends Ash in Sun and Moon series. He specializes in Electric-type Pokémon and is good with machines. Sophocles has a Togedemaru and a Charjabug which has since evolved into Vikavolt as his Pokémon partners. Sophocles is also a science nerd with a vast knowledge of technology. When he gets into something, he analyzes the subject thoroughly. He is also well-skilled in programming. In "A Shocking Grocery Run!", it is revealed that Sophocles has scotophobia, a fear of dark places, but overcomes them as he wanted to become an astronaut. After the events of the Vikavolt race he entered in, Sophocles obtained a Z-Ring from Hapu. He has his own laboratory constructed by his dad which he uses for research. He made a couple guest appearances in Pokémon Journeys, welcoming Ash back to Alola, encountered him and Goh at Mossdeep City, where Sophocles had to help Molayne's Ampharos guide the Talonflame 2 asteroid explorer back to Earth and welcoming Lillie's family back to Alola. He later watched Ash's battle against Leon.

Voiced by (English): Rebecca Soler (Sun & Moon); Emily Cramer (Journeys)
Voiced by (Japanese): Reina Ueda
Mallow is one of the students at the Pokémon School of Melemele Island who befriends Ash in Sun and Moon series. She is scatterbrained, but affectionate, and loves to cook. She specializes in Grass-type Pokémon, owning a Bounsweet, who was caught by her mother when she was younger, which evolves into a Steenee and later evolves again into Tsareena. She also works at her family's restaurant: Aina Kitchen. Mallow is a dedicated chef, who would go through miles of distance to find exotic ingredients or a new recipe. After helping a longtime family friend to her father and herself along with receiving a Grassium Z from Tapu Koko, Mallow obtained a Z-Ring from Oranguru. She made a couple guest appearances in an episode of Pokémon Journeys such as welcoming Lillie and her family back to Alola and watching the battle of Ash against Leon.

Voiced by (English): Roger Callagy
Voiced by (Japanese): Daisuke Namikawa
Rotom Pokédex is a Pokédex given to Ash by Professor Kukui, when Ash decided to have his adventure in Alola, in the third episode "Loading the Dex!" It is a self-learning A.I. due to Rotom inhabiting the device, and it can take pictures of and scan various Pokémon as well as provide information on it (e.g., name, type, unique profile). The Rotom Pokédex is not built for combat but it can record battles, as well as provide statistics (e.g., win–loss ratio). Despite this, it is fond of the show "Alolan Detective Laki" and it tends to jump to conclusions based on deductions. At the end of the Sun and Moon series, Rotom Pokédex leaves Ash to work for the Aether Foundation, running the company successfully while Lusamine, Lillie and Gladion were searching for Mohn. It also returned in Journeys.  It later watched Ash's battle against Leon.

Voiced by (English): Zeno Robinson
Voiced by (Japanese): Daiki Yamashita; Kei Shindō (young, JN001)
Goh is a stylish city boy, a new Pokémon Trainer who prefers to stay cool, calm and collected, in contrast to the more instinctive and adventurous Ash. He met Ash in Journeys series and travels with Ash in the entire world as researcher fellow. His dream is to catch every Pokémon to work his way up to Mew. His overconfidence has left him mostly isolated and had no interest in making friends, expect Chloe. However, Goh realized how wrong he was in not making other friends that weren't Chloe when he meets and gets to know Ash. He is also highly knowledgeable about Pokémon, being fairly adept at information-gathering and analyzing, both of which were useful in gathering clues. Despite his deep knowledge of Pokémon, Goh is still a rookie Trainer and lacks experience. Over time, however, Goh has grown as a Trainer through his travels and Ash's influences. To help achieve this dream, he participates in Project Mew missions and officially becomes a Chaser alongside Gary, Horace, Quillon, and Danika. Goh owns Pokémon of 18 types and owns all three Galar Starters. Before Ash's final battle with Leon could begin, Goh is forced to part ways with Ash as he has to help with Project Mew missions. He watched Ash's battle against Leon. Goh and other members of Project Mew travel to Faraway Island to find Mew, they encountered Mew but couldn't catch it. At the end of the Pokémon Journeys finale episode, Goh leaves Ash to travel throughout Kanto alone.

Voiced by (English): TBA
Voiced by (Japanese): Minori Suzuki
Liko is the female protagonist of upcoming Pokémon anime series. She's a trainer from Paldea and owns a mysterious pendant.

Voiced by (English): TBA
Voiced by (Japanese): Yuka Terasaki
Roy is the male protagonist of upcoming Pokémon anime series. He is from Kanto and owns a mysterious Poké-ball.

Rivals

Voiced by (English): Jimmy ZoppiVoiced by (Japanese): Yuko Kobayashi
Gary Oak is Ash's first rival. Gary hails from Pallet Town and is the grandson of renowned Pokémon researcher Professor Oak. Like Ash, Gary collects Gym badges and competes in Pokémon League tournaments in Kanto and Johto. At first, Gary is arrogant, always traveling with cheerleaders who called out his name and constantly teases Ash's group whenever they meet. After losing to a more powerful opponent in the Indigo League, Gary dispenses with the cheerleaders and then becomes more open-minded. At the end of season 2, Ash and Gary have their first Pokémon battle in which Gary's Eevee beats Ash's Pikachu. When the battle is over, Gary starts on a new journey to Johto and this subsequently influences Ash to follow him there. After losing to Ash in the Johto League, Gary decides to pursue a career in Pokémon research, impeding his rivalry with Ash. Until his loss to Ash, Gary had always thought of Ash as a poor trainer but he eventually comes to accept him as his equal. After Ash defeats the Battle Frontier and comes back to Pallet Town, Gary and Ash have a battle between Gary's Sinnoh Pokémon, Electivire, and Ash's Pikachu. Electivire easily beats Pikachu, which inspires Ash to travel to Sinnoh. While in Sinnoh, Gary becomes a Pokémon researcher working with Professor Rowan. By this time, Ash and Gary have become more of friends than rivals and they even team up to protect Pokémon from Pokémon Hunter J. After working together to protect a group of Shieldon from Pokémon Hunter J, they both agree to remain "friends until the end." Gary appears in seasons 1–5 (where it was only revealed that he started off with a Squirtle in season 5, while battling with a Blastoise) and 9–12, as well as in a fantasy in the last Black and White episode, "The Dream Continues!". He returns in Journeys as he was taking part in Project Mew missions, while travelling across the world to conduct his research. He reunites with Ash, meets Goh and battles Moltres alongside the duo. It is also revealed he frequently visits his grandfather and Ash's Pokémon reserves. Gary also persuaded Goh to take part in the Project Mew missions by acting like what he was during his rivalry with Ash. It is also revealed that he watched Ash's battle against Paul in the Sinnoh League. Gary is later revealed to be one of the Chasers for Project Mew next to Goh and Horace. He, along with the Project Mew Chasters were successful in meeting Mew in person. Afterwards, Gary introduced Horace to Professor Oak. Gary's Japanese name, is a reference to Shigeru Miyamoto, the mentor of Pokémon creator Satoshi Tajiri. 

Voiced by (English): Tara SandsVoiced by (Japanese): Minami Takayama
Ritchie is a traveling Pokémon trainer from Frodomar City. Ritchie first appears during the Indigo League, where he meets and forms a friendship with Ash. As rivals, Ritchie and Ash are much alike. For example, both trainers own a Pikachu and have caught many of the same Pokémon. After the Indigo League tournament, Ritchie is ranked in the top eight of the competition after defeating Ash, but then loses his next match. Afterward, Ash and Ritchie part ways but pledge an oath to become Pokémon Masters. Ritchie re-appears in the Whirl Islands near the beginning of the fifth season, Pokémon: Master Quest and is one of the protagonists of Pokémon Chronicles. He returns in Journeys after a long absence from the show watching Diantha's match against Lance.

Voiced by: Katsumi Toriumi (Japanese), Wayne Grayson (English)
Harrison is a traveling Pokémon trainer from Hoenn who participated in Johto League. Ash first meet him in "Pop Goes the Sneasel" when he tries to ward off a wild Sneasel guarding the sacred Ho-Oh flame. During the Johto League, Ash battles him in a full six-on-six battle. He defeats Ash but loses to his next opponent, finishing at the top four of the Johto League. After the Johto League, Harrison convinces Ash to go to the Hoenn region. Afterwards, Harrison goes to Kanto to participate in the Indigo League.

Voiced by (English): Oliver Wyman (4Kids); Bill Rogers (TPCi)
Voiced by (Japanese): Mitsuki Saiga
Drew is an experienced Pokémon Coordinator, a confident, critical, but popular boy. He is May's first and most prominent, rival. Because he sees similarities between new Coordinator May and himself when he first started out, he taunts her for her inexperience. Though his comments and attitude may have angered May, he still provides a helping hand whenever she needs it. Drew's skills have been a continuing inspiration for May to better herself as a Coordinator. Despite his initial attitude towards May, he slowly becomes of a friend towards her after the Hoenn Grand Festival to the point where both start to develop feelings towards each other. May finally manages to barely defeat Drew at the Indigo League Grand Festival, earning her a spot at Top 4. At the end of season 9, he heads towards to Johto to compete in more contests along with Harley and May. He also appeared season 11 watching May at the Wallace Cup and in Journeys watching Steven's match against Ash.

Voiced by (English): Andrew Rannells (4Kids); Billy Regan (TPCi)
Voiced by (Japanese): Jun'ichi Kanemaru
Arrogant, flamboyant and proud, Harley is a Pokémon Coordinator and May's rival. During their first meeting, Harley takes May's unwitting comments as insults to his abilities and he takes an instant dislike to her. Since then, Harley takes every opportunity to sabotage May before her contests, even teaming up with Team Rocket on occasion and frequently takes advantage of her forgiving nature to trick her into believing he has changed his ways. He is frequently seen dressed in a Cacturne costume. He travels to Johto alongside Drew and May at the end of season 9. He also appeared season 11 watching May at the Wallace Cup and in Journeys watching Steven's match against Ash.

Voiced by (English): Sean SchemmelVoiced by (Japanese): Masako Nozawa
Morrison is Ash's rival in the Hoenn region, and is a spirited person who likes to challenge other people to almost everything and never gives up in battle. Owing to this, he always challenges Ash to various events such as Pokémon battles or even a food eating contest. Ash first met him in "Less is Morrison", where he soon becomes a friend and rival to Ash. When he appears again, he is an opponent of Ash in Hoenn League; because of his conflicting feelings, he refuses to battle his friend until Ash encourages him to try his best. Morrison is able to battle with all his spirit, losing to Ash only when both of them are down to one Pokémon. After a long absence, Morrison watches Ash battling Steven Stone on television.

Voiced by (English): Marc Diraison
Voiced by (Japanese): Kenji Nojima
Tyson is a trainer originally from Mauville City. He first appeared in "Like a Meowth to a Flame", where he helped Ash and his friends defeat Team Rocket, using his Metagross. Meowth is his main Pokémon, seen dressed with a musketeer hat and boots. He later battles and defeats Ash in the Hoenn League. Tyson has five fully evolved Pokémon (Metagross, Hariyama, Shiftry, Donphan and Sceptile). Tyson then wins the Hoenn League. Tyson watched Ash's match against Steven Stone in Journeys series.

Voiced by (English): Andi Whaley
Voiced by (Japanese): Yōko Sōmi
Katie is the pride of Lilycove City, where she has the nickname "cool beauty" because of her fashion and flair. In battle, she is known for most commonly using Venomoth and Golduck and is known for carefully analyzing her opponent's moves. Katie's battle style is different from many other typical Trainers in the anime. Instead of sticking with one Pokémon in battle until it fainted, she would switch out her Pokémon for a stronger one if hers had a disadvantage. It is due to this strategy that she nearly defeats Ash in the first part of their battle. Ash eventually defeats Katie and moves on in the Victory Tournament. She later cameoed in Journeys watching Ash's battle against Steven Stone.

Voiced by (English): Sarah Natochenny
Voiced by (Japanese): Rie Tanaka
Solidad makes her debut appearance in "May, We Harley Drew'd Ya!", where it was revealed that she had defeated Drew in his first Pokémon Contest, causing him to cry. Since then they seem to have become friends. They see each other often in Contests and they also keep in touch. She also notices that Drew became more competitive, and she thinks May is the reason for this. "In Channeling the Battle Zone!", she battles May in the semifinal round of the Kanto Grand Festival. She is able to counter May's attacks as she had previously observed her battling style. She manages to win the battle against May, and then she wins the final round and became Top Coordinator. She travels in Johto and in "Staging a Heroes' Welcome!" and "Strategy with a Smile!", she makes a cameo appearance along with Harley and Drew, watching May perform live on TV at the Wallace Cup.

Voiced by: Kiyotaka Furushima (Japanese), Julian Rebolledo (English)
Paul is a roaming Pokémon trainer from Veilstone City in Sinnoh. As a Pokémon Trainer, Paul is experienced and has traveled across the regional areas of Kanto, Johto, Hoenn and Sinnoh, much like Ash. During Diamond and Pearl series, he begins to travel through Sinnoh, where he meets and develops a rivalry with Ash Ketchum. Paul is a grumpy and serious trainer whose only concern towards Pokémon is their ability to act in battle and who believes that forming bonds with Pokémon dilutes their potential, and is thereby seen by many characters for being the complete opposite of Ash. His harsh training style, competitive behavior, and desire to be strong derives from his resentment toward his older brother, Reggie, who had been an accomplished trainer until he lost to Pyramid King Brandon, causing him to quit Pokémon training to become a breeder. Paul is determined to make sure he doesn't meet that same fate, so he plans to surpass not just any trainer, but his own brother as well, although he is clearly unlikable to many because while he shows respect for strong trainers, such as Champion Cynthia, he never respects Trainers who he deems weak, and sometimes openly shows rudeness to others in battle. However, after suffering a humiliating defeat, and getting harshly scolded in the process, by Pyramid King Brandon, Paul was forced to fix his attitude as well as understand that strength was not everything. He ultimately loses his battle against Ash in the Sinnoh League. Afterwards, he finds a bit of respect for Ash and heads out to battle with Brandon. Paul is also seen again in the next episode, watching Ash's battle with Tobias on television. When Ash is defeated, Paul looks disappointed and walks away. He appears in Journeys in a flashback when Gary mentions Ash's Infernape and returns later on in the show in person. He reunites with Ash at Professor Oak's lab and trains him for his upcoming Masters Eight tournament by having a three on three battle with no switching on both sides, where Ash won. Paul has mellowed out most of his poor attitude and is more friendly such as letting his Electivire play with Ash's reserves and Goh's Grookey. It is revealed that Paul has received an offer to become a Gym Leader and he did not participate in the World Coronation series as he is "not interested in noisy crowds." After preparing Ash for the Masters 8 matches, he went back home to Veilstone City in time to watch Cynthia's match against Iris and Ash's match against Steven alongside Reggie.

Voiced by (English): Jamie McGonnigalVoiced by (Japanese): Tatsuhisa Suzuki
Barry is Ash's rival in Sinnoh. He is an impatient and overconfident boy who, while competent and skilled, tends to lose most of his battles against Ash. He is an admirer of Paul and uses the same technique though he cares for his Pokémon. He dreams of being the strongest Pokémon trainer in the world. Barry is friends with Kenny and the son of Palmer, the Tower Tycoon of Sinnoh's Frontier Brains.

Voiced by: Kazuya Nakai (Japanese), Billy Regan (English)
A talented Pokémon trainer and wandering minstrel, Nando is a calm young man deeply conflicted as to whether he should challenge gyms or become a Pokémon Coordinator. After battling both Ash and Dawn, he chooses to pursue both paths, regardless of the difficulty. By the time of the Sinnoh Grand Festival, he has acquired seven Gym Badges and five Contest Ribbons. In the Grand Festival, he is able to reach the Top 4, losing to Zoey. After the Grand Festival, he obtains the necessary badges to compete in the Sinnoh League; he is Ash's first opponent but is eliminated after putting up a good battle. Nando makes his debut appearance in "Dawn of a New Era!". He is usually seen playing his golden Mew harp. The harp has often been shown to attract large groups of wild Pokémon.

Voiced by: Kōzō Mito (Japanese), Billy Regan (English)
Conway is a particularly smart and cunning trainer, who carefully studies and analyzes trainers to create a strategy. He first encounters Ash during the Hearthome City Tag Battle Tournament, where he battles alongside Dawn and makes their way to the finals, only to be defeated by Ash and Paul. He later battles Ash in the third round of the Sinnoh League where he loses. A common gag of Conway is that he appears out of nowhere in a creepy manner, of which Dawn is usually the victim.

Voiced by (English): Emlyn Morinelli McFarlandVoiced by (Japanese): Risa Hayamizu
Zoey is an experienced Pokémon coordinator from Snowpoint City and Dawn's rival. She often gives out helpful advice and helps out in certain situations to Dawn. Zoey is initially disdainful of those who participate in both Gym battles and contests because she believes that trainers who divide their efforts do not full-heartedly compete in both disciplines. However, she changes her outlook as she meets trainers who are able to successfully manage both while respecting the hard work required. Zoey first appears in the episode of "Mounting a Coordinator Assault". In "A Grand Fight for Winning", she defeats Dawn in the final round of the Grand Festival and became Top Coordinator.

Voiced by: Yūko Mita (Japanese), Rhonda Krempa (Season 10–12), Erica Schroeder (Current) (English)
Kenny is one of Dawn's childhood friends and a rival. He frequently calls her by her nickname,  and is friends with Barry. Kenny makes his debut in "Getting the Pre-Contest Titters" and "Settling a Not-So-Old Score", where he and Dawn enter the Floaroma Pokémon Contest. Eventually, he is able to qualify for the Sinnoh Grand Festival, but misses the cut of 32 in the Grand Festival, causing him to leave Lake Valor to improve his training. Kenny is revealed to have romantic feelings towards Dawn and eventually challenges Ash to a battle with the outcome determining who Dawn would travel with. Though he wins the battle, Dawn leaves him a note stating that she wishes to remain with Ash.

Voiced by (English): Melissa SchoenbergVoiced by (Japanese): Ayako Kawasumi
One of Dawn's rivals, Ursula is a Coordinator from the Sinnoh region who enters the Chocovine Contest at the same time as Dawn. They meet just outside the Contest Hall when her Gabite gets into a confrontation with Dawn's Pachirisu. During the Sinnoh Grand Festival, she loses to Dawn and is eliminated from the contest, unable to make it into the Top 16.

Voiced by (English): J. Michael TatumVoiced by (Japanese): Hiroki Takahashi 
An incredibly powerful trainer, Tobias is mysterious, silent and unbelievably skilled, who apparently earns all eight of his gym badges only using his Darkrai. He competes in the Sinnoh League where, up until his battle with Ash, he manages to single-handedly defeat all of his opponents with just Darkrai. Ash battles him in the semi-finals, during which Darkrai ends up losing to Sceptile. Tobias still earns the victory losing only two Pokémon (Darkrai and Latios). He later wins the Sinnoh League with, once again, just his Darkrai. Tobias is universally despised by fans for first appearing in the middle of the League arc with little build-up and using a team of Mythicals and Legendaries in the League, without explanation as to how he acquired them.

Voiced by (English): Jamie McGonnigalVoiced by (Japanese): Akeno Watanabe
Trip is a trainer taking the Unova League challenge who appears in the Black and White series and whose ultimate ambition is to compete in the Champion League and defeat Alder, the Unova champion. In addition to being a Pokémon Trainer, he is also an amateur Pokémon photographer. Upon his first meeting and battle with Ash, he tends to somewhat display a discriminatory attitude toward him as being part of the "boonies" because Ash is from the Kanto region, along with his Pikachu, which happens to be extremely rare in the Unova region. Trip participates in the Club Battle, Clubsplosion, Junior Cup, and Unova League. With the exception of the Junior Cup, which he wins, he loses in the first round of each competition. After his battle with Ash in the Unova League, Trip appears to have ended his rivalry with Ash, and shows an apparent degree of respect towards him. Trip made a cameo in Journeys watching Iris battling Cynthia.

Voiced by: Shizuka Itō  (Japanese), Erica Schroeder (English)
Bianca is a trainer who appears in the Black and White series. She encounters Ash and his companions several times throughout the series which usually ends with a battle between herself and Ash. She is also shown to be excitable and clumsy. Bianca joins Ash, Iris and Cilan to participate in the Club Battle, Clubsplosion and Unova League tournaments. A running gag in the anime shows that when she encounters the group, she ends up pushing Ash into a nearby body of water, to Ash's dismay. Bianca returns in Journeys watching Iris' match against Cynthia.

Voiced by: Ikumi Hayama (Japanese), Suzy Myers (English) 
Burgundy is a Pokémon Connoisseur who at one point challenged Cilan and lost and Cilan said that her Oshawott was not compatible with her. When Ash, Iris and Cilan meet up with her once more, after she says that none of Ash's Pokémon are good for him, she reveals she challenged the Striaton Gym and got the Trio Badge, but still feels she needs to fight Cilan. Cilan defeats her again, but she exclaims she will fight him again someday and win. She later participates in the Club Battle, Clubsplosion, and Junior Cup tournaments with the group, held in Nimbasa Town, Ambiga Town and Lacunosa Town respectively, but loses in round one in all of them. She also tried to help a millionaire's daughter find a perfect Pokémon partner, but ends up being rejected as she was a C-Class Connoisseur.

Voiced by: Misato Fukuen (Japanese), Brittney Lee Hamilton (English)
Georgia is a trainer who calls herself a Dragon Buster, someone who specializes in defeating Dragon-type Pokémon. Incensed, Iris challenges her and the fight between Georgia's Beartic and Iris's Excadrill where Excadrill loses allows Iris to make Excadrill feel better about their loss to Drayden several years earlier. Georgia ties with Iris in a second battle, as Excadrill learned Focus Blast and gained trust in Iris. Georgia participates in the Club Battle, Clubsplosion, and Junior Cup tournaments with Ash, Iris and Cilan. She does become a bit nicer to Iris during the Ferroseed Research Center crisis. Georgia cameoed in Journeys watching Iris' match against Cynthia.

Voiced by: Tomohiro Waki (Japanese), Darren Dunstan (English) 
Stephan is a trainer whom Ash meets on the way to Nimbasa City. He and Ash have a battle, which Ash wins. Stephan participates in the Club Battle and Clubsplosion tournaments with the gang, the latter in which he and his Sawk win. He also participates in the Unova League, where he makes it to the Top 16. Here, he and Ash have an intense three-on-three battle in which Ash defeats him. Stephan returns in Journeys watching Iris' match against Cynthia.

Voiced by: Kōki Uchiyama (Japanese), Rory Max Kaplan (English)
Cameron a rival of Ash's. He debuts after the Junior Cup, as he meant to compete, but did not arrive in time. Cameron temporarily joins the group when he goes to earn his eighth Gym Badge from Marlon in Humilau City, and upon obtaining it, he leaves. Cameron returns to compete in the Unova League alongside Ash, Trip, Stephan, Bianca and Virgil. In Unova League, he defeats Bianca and during the Top 8 manages to defeat Ash despite being one Pokémon short but is subsequently defeated by Virgil in the Top 4. He seems to be unorganized as he misinterprets pretty much everything, such as thinking he needed seven gym badges to compete in a Pokémon league instead of eight.

Voiced by: Yūki Kaji (Japanese), Tom Wayland (English)
Virgil is a rescue worker with his father Jeff and his brother Davey. He saves Ash and his group when they fall off a bunch of rocks while trying to climb up to get to Vertress City, where Ash participates in the Unova League. After solving things at the dam, Virgil reveals he also entering the Unova League, making him one of Ash's rivals. He eventually wins the Unova League. It was revealed that as a young boy, he once got lost in the forest with his first Eevee, when it suddenly evolved into an Umbreon and was thus able to lead him out. This event made him fascinated with the Eevee species and led to him becoming an Eevee trainer.

Voiced by: Yurie Kobori  (Japanese), Jo Armeniox (English)
Shauna is energetic and loves making Pokévision videos with her Pokémon. She and her friends became fans of Serena after seeing the Pokévision video she made. She dreams of becoming a famous Pokémon Performer and ultimately Kalos Queen. She also cameos in Journeys watching Diantha's match against Lance.

Voiced by: Anri Katsu (Japanese), Todd Haberkorn (English)
Tierno is a Pokémon Trainer who loves to dance, which is also reflected in his party. Despite being a rookie Trainer, he can cope well when battling more experienced opponents thanks to his skills, teaching dance moves to his Pokémon so they can evade attacks with ease. Tierno is friendly and is always encouraging his friends to do their best. He is supportive of Shauna and often watches her Showcase performances. He has feelings for Serena, which he demonstrates every time they meet. He was responsible for introducing Shauna to Serena. He also cameos in Journeys watching the Masters Eight tournament.

Voiced by: Minami Fujii (Japanese), Michael Lockwood Crouch (English)
Trevor is a Pokémon Trainer and photographer, his goal as a Trainer is to meet every Pokémon in the Pokédex. Throughout his journey, Trevor aims to take pictures of all the Pokémon he encounters. He is mostly interested in ones with differences in their features, however slight. He competes in the Kalos League, but loses to Alain. Trevor also briefly appears in Journeys watching Diantha's match against Lance.

Voiced by (English): Maggie McDowell
Voiced by (Japanese): Saori Hayashi (season 17); Kei Shindō (seasons 18–19)
Miette is Serena's rival. She meets Ash and his friends when her Slurpuff eats one of Serena's PokePuffs. When she reveals they weren't good, she and Serena soon start a rivalry with each other. To prove who is the better baker, she and Serena enter a baking competition and though they make it to the final round, neither of them wins. She and Serena eventually settle their dispute and have a more friendly rivalry. During her time with the group, Miette soon realizes Serena's true feelings for Ash and warns her that if she doesn't confess her feelings then she will admit her own feelings and take Ash for herself. Miette soon meets up with Serena and the group again as she had decides to become a Pokémon Performer. Miette later participated in the Master Class Showcase but is defeated by Serena. Miette is present along with Shauna and Nini, watching the final performance between Serena and Aria. After the Master Class ended, Miette gathers outside with Shauna, Nini and Serena. Miette promises she would train more for the Showcases and departed off with Shauna and Nini away.

Voiced by: Motoko Kumai (Japanese), Jenny Emm (English)
Nini is a polite person and a confident Performer, aiming for the top. Ash and his friends first meet her when, while Serena's Pancham and Clemont's Chespin argue over a Poké Puff, they accidentally hit a Farfetch'd. Serena and Nini show each other the performances they intend to show at the Showcase, and become a rival to Serena. Much later, Nini comes to Anistar City, where she loses to Serena in the first round of the Anistar City Showcase. Having arrived at Couriway Town, neither Nini nor Serena win a Princess Key from the Couriway Town Showcase. They promise to each other to practice more to win their final Key. Nini later participates in the Master Class Showcase, but loses to Jessie in the first round. Nini is present along with Miette and Shauna, watching the final performance between Serena and Aria. After the Master Class ended, Miette gathers outside with Shauna, Nini and Serena. Nini promises she would train more for the Showcases and departs.

Voiced by: Ikue Ōtani (Japanese), Robby Duncan Sharpe (English)
Hailing from the Hoenn region, Sawyer is a new Pokémon trainer who chose Treecko as his starter Pokémon from Professor Birch. After meeting and battling Ash, he begins to respect Ash, looking to him as a mentor figure, and he sets his sights on surpassing Ash as a trainer. His Treecko develops a rivalry with Ash's Frogadier, even evolving in their second battle. Following the evolution of Grovyle into Sceptile and Ash's Frogadier into Greninja, their rivalry becomes even fiercer, though in the third battle between the two trainers, Sceptile is defeated by Greninja's new "Ash-Greninja" form. In the fourth battle between the two, Sawyer manages to defeat Ash, and then witnesses Ash's defeat at the hands of Snowbelle City Gym Leader Wulfric, mentally saying that the person he admired wouldn't have lost, and that the two would settle things at the Kalos League. At the Kalos League, Sawyer manages to advance all the way to the semi-finals, squaring off against Ash in a 6-on-6 battle, but ultimately loses, despite his Sceptile Mega Evolving. After the Kalos League, he helps fend off Team Flare and aids the civilian survivors in Lumiose City. When he later bids farewell to Ash after the Team Flare crisis, he reveals that his idol Steven Stone had given Sawyer a Key Stone to allow his Sceptile to Mega Evolve, and that he wants to repay the favor by becoming Steven's assistant; he is last seen working alongside Steven at the ruins of Lysandre Labs. However, he returns in Journeys watching Diantha's match against Lance.

Voiced by: Kenshō Ono (Japanese), Jonathan Silver (English)
Alain, Ash's rival in the Kalos region, is a calm, hot-headed figure, who shows little emotion and focuses his attention towards battling. Deep down, however, Alain does not wish to see ones closest to him suffer or get them in danger. Alain also obeys Lysandre's orders without much hesitation, since Lysandre is the one that equipped him with the Mega Ring and gave him the Mega Stone Charizardite X, which helps Charizard assume its Mega Charizard X form. During his travels, Alain meets and befriend Mairin as she chose to travel with him. At first, Alain wasn't thrill to have Mairin around but over time grew to enjoy her company and they both became best friends. Although, Alain's hot-headed personality cause to believed that having support from friends would hold him or others back and his beliefs led him to almost losing his friendship with Mairin. Alain works with Steven Stone while in Hoenn to uncover the secrets of Mega Evolution's origins. Alain takes control of a giant rock for Lysandre and Team Flare. To become stronger, he battles ten Mega Evolution trainers. After he asking his best friend to go back and finding out that her partner Chespie fell into an unexplainable coma, Alain blamed himself for what happen to the two as his goal shifted as began a new journey alone to acquire strength along with helping Lysandre to not only help and cheer his best friend up and to resort Chespie's health but also make things right with them. During his travels and due to the influence his best friend had on him, Alain began to question his beliefs in having support from friends as he not only begins to realize that it doesn't hold him or others back but also misses having Mairin around. Alain change in his beliefs was solidify when he meets Ash as he became both a rival and close friend to him, after witnessing Ash's Greninja's unique transformation. Being call in by Lysandre to help the other agents on their mission, Alain assists Team Flare in capturing the blue Zygarde Core. After a talk with Ash and wanting to battle him again, Alain was inspired to enter the Kalos League solely to battle against him, and ultimately ends up defeating him in the finals. After Team Flare began their final operation and when they captured Ash along with his Pokémon, Alain began to question Lysandre's intentions but ends up finding out that he was tricked into helping Team Flare take over Kalos and to control the two Zygarde. Realizing the truth, Alain not only felt guilty for his actions but also felt that his actions caused him to lose the only friends, Mairin and Ash, he ever had. Alain was stunned when he realizes why Lysandre wanted Ash as he wanted to control him and his Greninja for their Bond Phenomenon but they resisted his control. Alain then realized that he never lost the only friends he ever had, after Ash talk some sense and assured him that they'll always be friends no matter what. Wanting to make amends for his actions to his two friends, Alain sends his Charizard to rescue Pikachu and the rest of Ash's Pokémon, after Ash with his Greninja broke free from captivity, then he alongside Ash rescue Chespie. After Team Flare's defeat, Alain decides to help Professor Sycamore once again with his research and have been inspired by Ash decided to started a new journey from scratch with Mairin as his traveling companion again. He appears in Ultimate Journeys in the Masters Eight of the World Coronation Series. Alain battles Leon in the Masters 8 tournament but loses.

Voiced by (English): Eddy Lee
Voiced by (Japanese): Nobuhiko Okamoto
Gladion is Ash's rival in the Alola Region. He is also Lillie's elder brother and is a serious and calm trainer, who is looking to find himself worthy opponents in Pokémon battles. He is a "lone wolf" who avoids meeting with his sister because his battling style seems to somewhat edgy and ruthless. Despite this, he is noted by others how he still has a kind behavior shown when he tells his sister to take care of her Pokémon. While Gladion does not visit his sister often, he swore to protect her, after her encounter with the Ultra Beast. Four years before their appearance in the series, Gladion watched Lillie attacked by the Ultra Beast Nihilego. Lillie was terrified, while Gladion was not brave enough to defend her. Suddenly, a Silvally arrived, which defeated Nihilego. While Lillie lost her memory of the encounter and became scared of Pokémon, Gladion took the Silvally as his own Pokémon, and swore to protect his sister. One day, Gladion found an injured Eevee and brought it to Hobbes. Gladion was concerned about Eevee, though Hobbes promised it would recover if they took it to the Pokémon Center. Gladion was also motivated to go on a journey to find more about himself, as well as to train alone. Thus, he left Lillie and the mansion. After Lillie overcame her fears, he becomes more dedicated to surpassing Ash after witnessing him and Pikachu use 10,000,000 Volt Thunderbolt for the first time. Gladion even started to see his sister more often, and he's forming a close bond with her. He cleared Island Challenges, helping the Ultra Guardians out with the Necrozma mission, competed in the Alola League but lost to Ash in final round. Gladion and Lillie later find out that their father is still alive, and they leave with their mother to find him. He makes a flashback appearance in Journeys, where he is seen on a train with his father's Zoroark, accompanying Lillie and Lusamine in their search for Lusamine's husband and his and Lillie's father, Mohn. He returns later on in the show alongside Lillie and Lusamine where they reunite with Mohn at Crown Tundra. The family alongside Ash, Goh and Chloe head off to Alola for their homecoming as well as Ash's Battle Royale match. Gladion later watched Ash's showdown against Leon.

Voiced by (English): Neo Cihi
Voiced by (Japanese): Jun Fukuyama
Hau is a cheerful boy. Hau once fought against his grandfather, Hala, but his Dartrix ended up being defeated by his Crabrawler. Hala stated that Hau had to prepare himself the next time they'd face, since Hala would have to use his best in testing the boy. Hau was gone from Alola for some time, but returned with his father to take on the Island Challenge. Hau was training his Dartrix when the latter bound Ash, Pikachu and Rotom to a tree, thinking of them as its enemies. Soon, Ash and Hau initiated a conversation, where Hau learned that Ash battled his grandfather, Hala, in a Grand Trial. Hau admitted he faced Hala before, but failed; this time, he came back to Alola to complete the Island Challenge. Ash encouraged Hau, and showed Rowlet, who was sleeping. As Dartrix showed some interest, the two guys started a battle, in which Ash attempted to use the Z-Crystal. However, his fingers slipped and Rowlet was defeated. Hau cheered for this fun battle, and decided to take on Ash the next day, since he had things to do with his father. On that day, Ash came with Rowlet late, and apologized, since he was training. This time, Rowlet used Seed Bomb to attack Dartrix, who learned about this strategy and knocked off its Everstone that it launched. However, Ash attempted and succeeded in having Rowlet use Bloom Doom to defeat Dartrix. Hau fell to his knees, but congratulated to Ash for winning the battle. Ash encouraged Hau, who wanted to continue his Island Challenge, and have a Z-Move ready to execute against Ash the next time they'd meet, as the two parted ways. Both Ash and Hau competed against each other in the Alola League, where Ash merged victorious. Afterwards, he watches the rest of the league and help stop the Guzzlord invasion. Hau is later seen competing in Nanu's Grand Trial while Hala referees the match. He appears in Ultimate Journeys watching Ash's Battle Royale match.

Voiced by: Nozomu Sasaki (Japanese), Sam Black (English)
Horacio was arrogant and condescending, believing that his Charjabug's top-class equipment and Speed-increasing nature would allow him to win the race with ease. He was also a bad sport, mocking Sophocles and the latter's Charjabug. He also disregarded the well-being of his Pokémon, by not allowing his Charjabug to take a break during pit stops, resulting in Charjabug being too exhausted to continue and allowing Sophocles and his own Charjabug to get ahead of them. This was seen again in Evolving Research!, when he arrived at a bridge with the Bug Stone at the other side. He disregarded Sophocles's warning about the bridge being unstable and continued on, resulting in the bridge collapsing, and he had to be saved by Sophocles's Vikavolt. Horacio has mellowed down his arrogance since then and respects Sophocles, which still continues during the Vikavolt race.

Voiced by (Japanese): Kōhei AmasakiVoiced by (English): Khoi Dao
Rinto is a trainer whose main partner Pokémon is a Gallade, as well as a competitor in the Pokémon World Coronation series. He first appeared in the series where he watches Ash and his Farfetch'd battling against Dozer and his Gurdurr in an official Pokémon World Coronation battle at Rock Tunnel. After Ash emerged victorious, Rinto took note that Ash's Farfetch'd, while powerful, was too reckless. While Farfetch'd did try to fight Gallade, Gallade evaded all attacks and defeats it with False Swipe. Rinto tells Ash that they will battle again when Ash and Farfetch'd were in sync. Sometime later after Ash trained his Farfetch'd, he runs into Rinto again and is challenged into an official World Coronation series battle. It turns out that in the first encounter that Rinto recently entered and was in the Normal Class, while Ash was in the Great Class, hence why Ash did not receive a World Coronation battle notification. Despite Gallade activating its Justified ability (Attack stats increase when hit by Dark-type moves such as Night Slash) and cutting Farfetch'd's leak in half, Rinto loses to Ash's newly evolved Sirfetch'd. Rinto admits that he still has a lot to learn when battling.

Voiced by (English): Hayden Daviau
Voiced by (Japanese): Yui Ogura
Marnie is Piers' younger sister who also specializes in Dark-type Pokémon, as well as a competitor in the World Coronation Series. Like in the games, she is Team Yell's Idol and Morpeko is her best friend and main Pokemon. However, in the anime, Grimmsnarl is confirmed by Piers to be her true ace. She first appeared as Ash's next opponent in an Ultra Class match in the Ultimate Journeys. Team Yell however, tried to trick Ash by stating that the match is in Piers' Gym so they can have Marnie win by default, however Piers was able to get Ash right on time for his battle, as Marnie waits. Marnie wants to battle him properly to prove that Spikemuth can have tougher opponents to battle in Galar instead of winning by default. She outright scolded Team Yell for their actions once Ash reveals the truth to her. Marnie's motivation of being Champion was to make her hometown more popular again. While she does put up a good fight, she loses the match to Ash. Nevertheless, she and Piers congratulate Ash on his win. Her performance in battle has convinced visitors to visit Spikemuth, thus bringing back life to her dilapidated hometown. She, along with Piers and Team Yell, later got to watch Ash's battle with Leon.

Voiced by (English): Jenny Yokobori
Voiced by (Japanese): Ayahi Takagaki
Horace is a childhood friend of Goh as well as a member of the Project Mew mission. Three years prior to the events of Journeys, Horace first met Goh while searching for Celebi. Both of them searched for Celebi only to be scared off by the wild Pokémon, but decided to try again the next day. Unfortunately, Horace fell ill and was unable to meet up with Goh, causing Goh to develop a grudge against him, as if Horace stood him up. Horace wrote a letter a couple years later hoping to undo his mistake in the past while hoping that Goh would find the letter. When the two met again, they both made amends with each other. Sometime later, it is revealed that Horace became a part of Project Mew as he wants to see more Psychic-type Pokémon and is later revealed to be one of the Chasers alongside Gary and Goh. He has appeared in a couple episodes participating in the Project Mew missions such as the Articuno raid battle and the Sea Mauville Battle Royale. Along with the other Project Mew Chasters, Horace was able to successfully meet Mew. Later, he and Gary got to meet Professor Oak.

Voiced by (English): Lizzie Freeman
Voiced by (Japanese): Ayana Taketatsu
Lisia is Wallace's niece and a Pokémon Coordinator. She first appeared in 15th episode of the Pokémon Ultimate Journeys: The Series where she met Chloe and invited her in Lilycove City Pokémon contest and later, she participated in the contest as well and tied for the 1st spot with Serena. She watched Ash's final showdown against Leon.

Gym Leaders

Kanto Gym Leaders
All eight Gym Leaders from the Kanto region. For more information on Misty and Brock, see the protagonists section. For more information on Giovanni, see the Antagonists section.

Voiced by: Fumihiko Tachiki (Japanese), Maddie Blaustein (English)

Lt. Surge is the Electric-type Gym Leader from Vermillion City. Rude, arrogant and loud, he views challengers as "babies" unless they defeat him and prefers to evolve his Pokémon as soon as possible. One of the most dangerous tactics is his reliance on brute strength and has defeated multiple trainers with that tactic. He looks down on anyone with non-fully evolved Pokémon. When Ash first fought him, Pikachu was easily overwhelmed by Raichu in terms of brute strength. When it was time for a rematch, Ash was able to exploit Lt. Surge's Raichu's fatal flaw. Because Lt. Surge evolved his Raichu as soon as it was caught as a Pikachu, it only learned brutal attack strategies and not speed tactics. Ash was able to use Pikachu's tail to ground the electricity and use his speed to knock out Raichu. Afterwards, Lt. Surge stops being rude to Ash and congratulates and respects him on the win. Lt. Surge also appears in flashback in a Diamond and Pearl episode, "Pika and Goliath!", which recycles a lot of elements from Surge's debut episode: Ash's Pikachu loses to a Raichu owned by an arrogant trainer (due to it knowing Hyper Beam, a move Pikachu cannot use unless it evolves into Raichu), Pikachu refusing the Thunder Stone, and Ash wiping the smirk off a trainer's Raichu in a rematch, earning respect. In Journeys, Lt. Surge is away from his Gym for training and has one of his assistants, Visquez, run the Gym in his absence. It is mentioned by Visquez that Lt. Surge's Raichu taught her own Raichu how to battle and Ash's victory in his Gym is widely acknowledged.

Voiced by: Kae Araki (Japanese), Lisa Ortiz (English)

The Psychic-type Gym Leader of Saffron City. It is revealed she came from a family of psychics, and she has psychic powers as well. Unfortunately, she grew way too obsessed with developing them, making her an emotionless Gym Leader while her eerie cheeriness is manifested in a form of a doll, resembling her younger self, creating a split personality. Although she hosts a school to train Psychics, she can also use her powers to turn any defeated challengers into dolls for her dollhouse. At first glance in her debut series, she appeared as a young girl who helped rescue Ash and company from Team Rocket, until she reveals her true identity. She almost succeeded in turning Ash into one when he forfeits her battle against her Abra/Kadabra but was saved by Sabrina's father. Her father told Ash to acquire a Ghost-type Pokémon to counter Psychic-types. After befriending a wild Haunter, he takes it back to the Gym. At first, things were looking bad for Ash as Haunter was nowhere in sight and he had to use Pikachu against Kadabra. Luckily, Haunter appears and starts cheering Sabrina up by making funny faces. Sabrina laughed which caused her and Kadabra to be incapacitated, and both personalities merged as one, and she loses her match with Ash. While Haunter stayed behind to stabilize Sabrina's mentality, she gives Ash her Gym badge for making her laugh and become friendly again. Sabrina is the fourth Gym Leader Ash faces, instead of the sixth like in the games.

Voiced by (Japanese): Kyoko HikamiVoiced by (English): Leah Applebaum (4kids era), Nathalie Gorham (TPCi, M20), Lauren Landa (TPCi, Journeys)

The Grass-type Gym Leader of Celadon City, Erika also runs a perfume shop, which contains the essence of her Gloom as her main ingredient. As a child, she had a nasty run in with a wild Grimer. Fortunately, she was saved by a wild Gloom, which drove the Grimer off. Since then, the two became inseparable. In her debut, while everyone enjoyed the perfume scent, Ash insulted the perfume. A furious Erika and her employees kicked him out and banned him from the store. Ash tried to enter her gym, which is also a greenhouse, next, but her employees threw him out as well as they heard about him insulting the perfume. With no options left, Ash sought help from Team Rocket after they were caught and thrown out for attempting to steal the perfume. Posing as a girl named , he was able to gain access and become a student and learned more about Erika's background. Unfortunately, his disguise was unveiled and he challenges her to a Gym Battle. However, during the match, the Gym gets set on fire thanks to Team Rocket starting it in the Gym using bombs. Everyone had to evacuate and put out the fire. Although Ash felt guilty of being part of this retaliation, he immediately goes in and rescue Erika's Gloom who was trapped inside the burning building. Both Erika and Ash made peace with each other and she gave Ash his Rainbow Badge for saving her Pokémon. Although Team Rocket also stole the secret ingredient to her perfume, Erika reveals that it contains the essence of Gloom, which smells horrible, much to Team Rocket's dismay. She is the fifth Gym Leader Ash encountered rather than the fourth like in the games. She also appears in Pokémon the Movie: I Choose You, which is an alternate timeline. In the film, Ash does defeat Erika and earn his Rainbow Badge. Erika is much nicer in the film, as it was done to make her close to her game counterpart and serve as an apology to Western fans for making her a complete jerk in the anime. Erika returns in Ultimate Journeys after a long absence in the main storyline. In her reappearance, she was hosting a Pokémon Flower Arranging class, where trainers decorate their Pokémon with flowers and have them perform to mirror their characteristics and designs. Her gym was also revealed to have been rebuilt since the last encounter. Erika also reunites with Ash while acknowledging his past heroics and is much more friendlier than her debut appearance. It's implied that neither Ash nor Erika were proud of making a bad first impression to each other, given that the two did not mention this problem that caused the Celadon Gym to be caught on fire to Goh or Chloe. Originally, the anime version of Erika has been loathed by Western fans for her being a clueless and irresponsible Gym Leader, such as unintentionally letting her staff banning challengers just because they don't like her perfume. However, as of the Ultimate Journeys episode, "Suffering the Flings and Arrows!", Western fans have finally forgiven the writers for this serious offence in the main timeline.

Voiced by: Hōchū Ōtsuka (Japanese), Stan Hart (English)

Koga is the Poison-type Gym Leader from Fuschia City and a ninja. Unlike in the games, he does not have a daughter named Janine. Rather, he has a younger sister and student named Aya. Aya challenged Ash to make his way through Koga's booby-trapped infested Gym and fight her first. After merging successful, Ash earned the right to face off against Koga. Although the battle was interrupted by Team Rocket, Ash and Koga resumed their battle where Ash merged victorious. Koga is the sixth Gym Leader Ash encountered rather than the fifth like in the games. He reappeared in a flashback episode in the Black and White anime when Ash was reminiscing his days with his Charizard.

Voiced by: Toshiya Ueda (Japanese), Roger Kay (English)

Blaine is the Fire-type Gym Leader of Cinnabar Island. He closed down his Gym prior to his debut appearance, as the island became a tourist attraction, due to the hot springs and runs an inn. He challenges people with riddles and tends to make puns even at inappropriate times. By providing riddles to Ash, Misty and Brock, Misty solves each one which led them straight towards to his gym, where Blaine revealed himself. Ash fought him on a three on three battle, but forfeited due to Pikachu almost falling into the lava and Charizard's disobedience. Later, Ash battles him in a rematch and emerges victorious.

Orange Island Gym Leaders
Upon learning about a League there, Ash decided to participate. Unlike in the other regions where there was eight Gym Leaders, Ash faces off against four. None of the Gym Leaders specialize in a certain type, but more on how to do tasks and win challenges to earn a badge, while interacting with their Pokémon. Once the challenger acquires all four Gym Badges, they earn the right to face off against the Supreme Gym Leader. Should the challenger succeeds, then they got into the Hall of Fame and are Champions (but not official region Champions). The format is similar to the player facing the Elite Four and the Champions just like in the games.

Voiced by: Miki Nagasawa (Japanese), Tara Sands (English)
Cissy is the Gym Leader from the Mikan Island Gym of the Orange Islands and Senta's older sister. To obtain the Coral-Eye Badge, trainers must win in an accuracy test and a race against her by using Water type Pokémon. When facing Cissy as his first Orange League Gym Challenge, Ash had to participate in two contests against her. Using her Seadra against Ash's Squirtle in an accuracy test, both sides had an equal precision for hitting the cans and the result was a tie. Before the race, Team Rocket stole Cissy's Blastoise, but were blasted off. In the aquatic race, Ash was losing, but Ash's Lapras froze the water so that it could slide on it, making Ash win the race and the badge.

Voiced by: Yasunori Matsumoto (Japanese), Jim Malone (English)
Danny is the Gym Leader of the Navel Island Gym from the Orange Islands. Danny approached Ash, Misty and Tracey and complimented Misty, causing her to be flattered. He accompanied Ash when they climbed the mountain, then fought against Team Rocket for their attempt at stealing Pikachu. At the top, Misty and Tracey realized he was the Gym Leader. After this revelation, Ash and Danny had three challenges. He used Nidoqueen against Ash's Lapras to freeze the geyser and won. The next challenge was to shape the ice like a sledge, which Ash won as his Charizard burned him, melting the parts of the ice. The last challenge was a race, but it was temporarily stopped due to Team Rocket's attempt. Ash and Danny continued the race and while the odds were in Danny's favor, Ash's slide spun around and he landed in the sea. But luckily, Ash managed to win the race and the badge.

Voiced by: Ryō Horikawa (Japanese), Matt Mitler (English)
Rudy is the Gym Leader of Trovita Island, who gives trainers the Spike Shell Badge if they beat him. While the gang was on the way to the island they spotted a little girl, who happens to be Rudy's little sister. Misty saved the little girl and Rudy falls instantly in love with Misty. Ash and Tracey were confused about this but Misty was excited about it. Eventually, Rudy wanted Misty to stay with him for good. He had a battle with Ash, using the Pokémon's dancing moves to evade the attacks and counter them. He saw that Misty actually cared for Ash more than him. Knowing it was the right thing to do, he let her go and continue her journey.

Voiced by (English): Kayzie RogersVoiced by (Japanese): Mami Koyama
Luana is the Gym Leader of the Kumquat Island Gym from the Orange Islands. She mistook Ash to be her son, as Travis went on his own journey, dressed like Ash and having a Pikachu as well. After Team Rocket were defeated, Luana let him, Misty and Tracey into her hotel, as they saw the luxury. She had a tag battle against Ash, using her Alakazam and Marowak against his Charizard and Pikachu. Although she had the advantage, as Pikachu and Charizard did not get along with each other, but was soon defeated when Pikachu and Charizard started working together. She gave Ash the Jade Star Badge, who promised to greet her son and tell him his mom misses him.

Voiced by: Kōji Yusa (Japanese), Scott Rayow (English)
Drake is the strongest trainer of the Orange Islands and Champion (Supreme Gym Leader) who resides on Pummelo Island. Despite his skills as a trainer, he grew bored with being unbeatable and wondered if there was going to be a challenger to defeat him. Many trainers who challenged him lost either early in the game or when he uses his ace Pokémon, Dragonite.

Eventually, Ash arrived with his four Orange Island badges which earned him the right to face Drake. This is the first time in the series where we get to see a full 6 on 6 battle. At first, Ash was able to consecutively defeat four of Drake's Pokémon (one of the battles ended in a tie). Things took a turn for the worse, when Drake uses his Electabuzz and his Dragonite to wear down four of Ash's remaining Pokémon. Eventually, Ash was able to use Pikachu to defeat Dragonite. Ash was made Orange Island Champion as a result. The Orange Islands achievement gets referenced a couple times in the series and Ash's Orange Island trophy makes a cameo in the second episode of Journeys.

Ditto is the first Pokémon Drake uses and many trainers failed to defeat Ditto, which can mimic their Pokémon's moves. Drake always uses his Dragonite last in battles.

Johto Gym Leaders
The eight Gym Leaders from Johto and members of the Johto League.

Voiced by (English): Matthew MitlerVoiced by (Japanese): Akira Ishida

Falkner is the Flying-type Gym Leader from Violet City. He has a self-righteous attitude and does not like people assuming that every Flying-type Pokémon will always lose to Electric-types. Despite this, he does care about his Pokémon and has a nice personality. His Gym is located on the rooftop on one of the buildings and he also trains his students there. He bonds with his Pokémon by hang-gliding across the city.

He first appeared in the series helping Ash rescue his Pikachu from Team Rocket. After the ordeal was done, he and Ash decided to have a battle. Upon noticing Falkner using the same attack combos, Ash was able to overcome and defeat Falkner.

Voiced by (English): Tara SandsVoiced by (Japanese): Hiromi Ishikawa

Bugsy is the Bug-type Gym Leader from Azalea Town. When Ash and co. first arrived in the Gym, he was nowhere to be found. However, after Misty gets startled by the Bug-types in the Gym, she unintentionally knocked down a ladder as Bugsy was viewing them from a tree. Bugsy criticized Misty for her ignorance towards them. Afterwards, Ash challenges Bugsy to a Gym battle which he accepts and Ash also had to help Bugsy down from the tree.

Bugsy uses a variety of defense tactics against Ash's Pokémon to cover up type disadvantages. However, as he failed to cover all the weak spots, Ash found an opening and defeated all of Bugsy's Pokémon easily.

Voiced by (English): Megan HollingsheadVoiced by (Japanese): Yūko Miyamura

Whitney is the Normal-type Gym Leader from Goldenrod City. Her uncle, Milton, owns a Miltank dairy farm which produced delicious Moomoo milk. This is where Whitney was able to obtain her Miltank.

In her debut appearance, she and her Clefairy bumped into Ash and Pikachu. She kisses Pikachu's bruised forehead, much to his amusement. She took Ash and co. all around the city, where they ended up taking wrong routes. Team Rocket attempted to steal her Clefairy, but they sent Team Rocket blasting down the unfinished magnet train rail. When it was time for the Gym battle, Ash was able to defeat Whitney's Nidorina easily and her Clefairy forfeited due to using Splash (via Metronome). Unfortunately, Whitney turns the tables and flattens his Pikachu, Cyndaquil and Totodile using Miltank's Rollout.

The next day, Whitney invited Ash and co. to her uncle's farm where they enjoyed the milk and learn how to handle a Miltank. When Team Rocket used a barrel-shaped mech to attack the farm, Ash came up with a strategy to counter the Rollout tactic. Using it, he was able to defeat Whitney. Although the rematch took place outside her Gym, Whitney counted it as an official win and gives Ash his Gym badge. Unlike in the games, Whitney does not cry and throw a tantrum when she does lose. It is also revealed in the next episode that whenever someone merges victorious against Whitney, they get interviewed on DJ Mary's radio station. She later appears in a few flashbacks.

Voiced by (English): Andrew Rannells Voiced by (Japanese): Masaya Matsukaze

Morty is the Ghost-type Gym Leader from Ecruteak City. His family had lived there for centuries, and he teaches his students about Ghost-types. He also allows them to watch official Gym battles.

Morty meets Ash and co. when the gang went to the Burned Tower, which they mistaken for a Gym. It turns out the Burned Tower was inhabited by Ghost Pokémon, which Morty was able to befriend. Afterwards, he and Ash had a Gym battle where Ash merged victorious.

While heading to Mahogany Town, Ash and friends arrived in Ectruteak City again and run into Morty and his friend, Eusine. This time, they along with Ash and co. prevented Team Rocket from stealing the silver bells of Tin Tower. While blasting Team Rocket off, the gang see Suicune in the process. He later appears in a few flashbacks.

Voiced by (English): Dan GreenVoiced by (Japanese): Nobuaki Kakuda (1st appearance); Takahiro Fujiwara (2nd appearance)

Chuck is the Fighting-type Gym Leader from Cianwood City. He once travelled to Galar where he studied karate and met a younger Bea. He was also revealed to have trained Brawly, the Fighting-type Gym Leader from Hoenn, and served as a role model for Frontier Brain Greta. He is happily married to his wife and he runs a dojo, which also serves as his gym.

Owing to Jasmine's Ampharos being too sick and Jasmine had to take care of it, she tells Ash of a Gym in Cianwood City and recommends to challenge there instead. In his debut, Ash and co. encountered him training with his Machoke. After meeting the gang, he brings them to his Gym, where his wife cooks up a delicious meal. Afterwards, it was time for the Gym match, where Ash merged victorious. Upon learning that Jasmine's Ampharos still needs to rest and recover, Chuck tells Ash and co. to visit Whirl Islands.

He appears in a fantasy in the Ruby and Sapphire series. He returns in Journeys after a long absence where he trains with Bea, reunites with Ash, and later watches Bea battling Ash. Afterwards, he made desserts for Ash, Bea and their Pokémon.

Voiced by (English): Tara Sands (4Kids era), Alyson Leigh Rosenfeld (TPCi, Diamond and Pearl)Voiced by (Japanese): Yumi Kakazu

Jasmine is the Steel-type Gym Leader from Olivine City. When Ash went to battle, he fought Jasmine's apprentice, Janina, who was impersonating the Gym Leader. Jasmine called off the battle and berated her apprentice for her antics. Jasmine could not battle Ash at the moment as her Ampharos, she kept at the lighthouse, was sick. She had to send Janina on an errand to fetch the medicine from Cianwood City and informs Ash that there is a Gym there he should try out while waiting. Unfortunately, even though Ash won his gym battle there, Ampharos was still recovering so Ash and co. decided to visit the Whirl Islands instead. Afterwards, the heroes returned to Olivine City as Ampharos was fully recovered and now Jasmine was ready for battle. Despite putting up a good fight, Jasmine loses to Ash.

Sometime later, Jasmine went to visit Sunyshore City in Sinnoh. Ash and co. met her shortly after his victory against Volkner. Here, she was watching Kenny do a series of contest combinations. It is revealed that she was travelling around studying Contest battles to improve her tactics. Jasmine battled Flint of the Sinnoh Elite Four where she loses.

Later, at the Pokémon Center, Dawn was feeling uncertain of what to do with her journey and was torn between cheering Ash at the Sinnoh League, or go with Kenny on a Contest journey. Jasmine advised Dawn to follow her own path and trust her instincts. While Dawn wrote a letter of goodbye to Kenny and went to cheer Ash on in the Sinnoh League, Jasmine leaves the next day, heading back home to Olivine City. Her appearance in this episode is a reference to her cameo in the Diamond, Pearl and Platinum Games.

Voiced by (English): James Carter CathcartVoiced by (Japanese): Motomu Kiyokawa; Koichi Sakaguchi (young)

Pryce is the Ice-type Gym Leader from Mahogany Town. Pryce and his Piloswine were best friends in their early days as a Trainer and spent battling many other trainers. After losing to a Magmar, both Pryce and Piloswine suffered severe burns. While recovering, Piloswine left one night with no explanation and disappeared. Since then, Pryce grew bitter towards challengers and their Pokémon.

He refused to battle Ash due to the belief that Pokémon can't be friends and he viewed Ash's strategies as weak. However, while battling Team Rocket, both Ash and Pryce came across a cave where his Piloswine was found frozen. It turns out that Piloswine tried to find herbs and berries to cure their burns but ended up frozen in the process. Pryce stopped being rude and helped Ash and co. defeat Team Rocket. Afterwards, Pryce accepts Ash's Gym Challenge. Although Ash and Pryce both put up a good fight, Pryce forfeited his match as his Piloswine was too exhausted and Ash knocked it down three times, which ruled as a T.K.O. This is the only time where Ash won his Gym Badge with the Gym Leader forfeiting the battle.

Voiced by (English): Megan Hollingshead (4Kids era), Eva Christensen (TPCi, Black and White)Voiced by (Japanese): Yuko Mita

Clair is the Dragon-type Gym Leader from Blackthorn City. She was revealed to have mentored Lance of the Kanto Elite Four. Ash, Misty and Brock first encountered Clair when her Dratini had to shed its skin. While Team Rocket attempted to steal Dratini, Clair and Ash had to help protect it which caused Dratini to evolve into a Dragonair. Shortly after, she had to perform a ritual to purify a Dragon Fang at Riverhead Falls, before accepting Ash's challenge.

When Ash and Clair were battling, Team Rocket stole the Dragon Fang, causing the battle to be called off. Ash and co. chased after them and prevented a Dragonite from going on a rampage and put out the fire that was threatening the Dragon Holy Land. Once everything was cleared up, Ash and Clair resumed their Gym Battle where Ash merged victorious and earned his final badge. Unlike in the games, Ash did not have to do a cave trial to earn the badge and Clair is not a sore loser.

She appeared in a flashback in a Diamond and Pearl episode. She officially reappears in the Decolore Islands arc, where she was searching for a Shiny Druddigon that lived in Cave Island. During this quest, she reunites with Ash and met his Unova companions, Iris and Cilan, as well as revealing that she caught the same Dragonite from the Dragon Holy Land. After calming down the Shiny Druddigon, Clair catches it and heads back home to Blackthorn City, but not before agreeing with Iris for a battle. In the undubbed post-Black and White series episodes, Iris went with Clair to the Dragon Holy Land where they encountered and calmed a wild Gible. Iris later battled Clair and lost. She only appears in a flashback again in Journeys when Drayden mentioned about how Iris became the Unova Champion.

Hoenn Gym Leaders
The eight Gym Leaders for the Hoenn League. During Ash's Hoenn League quest and Sinnoh League quest, Wallace was Hoenn champion at the time, hence why he is not listed here. As of the XY anime, Wallace is no longer Hoenn Champion as he went back to his job as Gym Leader in Sootopolis City. For information on Norman, see the Associates section.

Voiced by (Japanese): Yuri ShiratoriVoiced by (English): Karen Neill

Roxanne is the Rustboro Gym Leader who specializes in Rock-type Pokémon. She was a top graduate at her Pokémon School in Rustboro City and now currently works as a teacher for the beginner's class. Because of her strong academic standings and excellent record, she was granted the role of a Gym Leader. Ash and pals encountered her during a school trip, where she invites them to visit the school. It is revealed that she knows Brock as he was a Rock-type Gym Leader as well as Professor Oak, as he gave remote lectures to this school.

The next day, Roxanne gets to battle Ash, while allowing some of the senior students to film the Gym battle. Roxanne reveals that by filming a Gym battle, students can learn how battles play out in real life. Before the battle starts, May admits to Roxanne that she wanted to pursue Pokémon contests, which Roxanne was fine with. Despite relying on various defense strategies, Roxanne loses to Ash.

Voiced by (Japanese): Kōhei KiyasuVoiced by (English): Jason Griffith

The Fighting-type Gym Leader from Dewford Town, Brawly is a professional surfer and owns a private island where he teaches people how to surf. It is revealed that he once trained under Chuck. Ash wanted to battle Brawly, but he spends most of the time surfing. Unbeknownst to Ash, the surfing tactic was Brawly's way of how to dodge attacks, while maintaining balance and focus. When Brawly battles Ash, he beats Ash and his Treecko easily with his newly evolved Hariyama. Ash was harshly berated by his friends for making his Treecko continuing to battle despite gaining numerous injuries against Hariyama as well as his arrogance. After learning his lesson, Ash learned how Brawly was able to use surfing as a strategy and taught his Pokémon that tactic. Ash decided to stay on Dewford Island for a while to train for his rematch.

When a storm arrived, he interrupted Ash's battle with one of his students, Shauna, forcing everyone to seek shelter in a cave. He refereed Ash's match with Shauna with Ash merging victorious. Shortly after, Ash was able to defeat Brawly in a rematch, while using the geysers to his advantage.

Voiced by (Japanese): Ken'ichi OgataVoiced by (English): Dan Green

Wattson is the Electric-type Gym Leader from Mauville City. He is usually portrayed as a jolly old man. In his debut appearance, Ash and pals entered his Gym through a roller coaster ride. Along the way, they came across a mechanical Raikou which attacked the heroes. Thinking it was the real Raikou, Ash ordered Pikachu to attack it which not only damages the robot, but also supercharges Pikachu's electric attacks. When it was time for the battle, Ash earned his victory (albeit lopsided) by having Pikachu one-hit knock out all three of Wattson's Pokémon. Although it was a legit win and Ash earned the badge, Wattson started to get upset and sat near the Mauville plant to think about what happened. Fortunately, a wild Electrike greeted him and cheered up Wattson. After Ash explained what had happened in the battle, Wattson allowed Ash to keep his badge.

Later as Ash and friends were heading back to Petalburg City for Ash's Gym battle against Norman, they ran into Wattson again. Ash and Wattson had a friendly battle with Wattson's Manectric defeating Ash's Torkoal.

Voiced by (Japanese): Rio NatsukiVoiced by (English): Lisa Ortiz

Flannery is the new Fire-type Gym Leader of Lavaridge Town and owner of the local hot-springs. She inherited the gym from her grandfather, after he retired and became a poet. As a new Gym Leader, Flannery tends to make a lot of errors in her duties and she sought Ash and his friend's help to clean up the battlefield for Ash's Gym Battle.

While battling Ash, she does have surprisingly good tactics such as using Smog and Sandstorm attacks to provide ambush tactics. However, due to her overusing Overheat (power level decreases after every use) and her stress temperament, Flannery ended up costing her Gym battle victory. However, her grandfather commended her for putting up a good battle.

Voiced by (English): Amy BirnbaumVoiced by (Japanese): Hyōsei

Winona is the Flying-type Gym Leader from Fortree City. She has a habit of praying to the sky to grant her good luck before a battle starts. She first appears in the show giving children a ride on her large Skarmory at the Fortree City Feather Carnival. Before her battle with Ash could take place, she and the heroes had to stop Team Rocket from stealing the various Pokémon at the Carnival. Afterwards, she has her official Gym battle with Ash, where she loses.

In her battle, Winona uses flight paths and angles for accurate attacks with her Pokémon. She learns how to adapt to various weather conditions (e.g., windy days). The Fortree Gym battlefield is out in the open, allowing her and her opponent's Pokémon to fly and fight, which is her philosophy. Winona's Swellow in the anime is a Shiny to differentiate hers and Ash's Swellow during the final phase of the battle.

 and 
Tate voiced by: Takahiro Mizushima (Japanese), Jason Griffith (English)
Liza voiced by: Chisa Yokoyama (Japanese), Andi Whaley (English)

Tate and Liza are fraternal twins of the Psychic-type Gym in Mossdeep City. Their father, Jin, works as an astronaut and director of the Mossdeep Space Center, alongside their mother, Rachel, the mission control operator. Although twins, Liza is slightly older by a few minutes, and constantly teases Tate about it. Sometimes the twins tend to bicker too much, which causes them to lose focus in battles, allowing their opponents take a free hit. Despite this, the twins care for each other deep down.

In their first appearance, the twins give Ash and friends a tour of the Space Center, and let them experience a zero-gravity room using only their Baltoy. They later help Ash and co. stop Team Rocket from stealing a space shuttle that was intended to be used for Jin's space exploration.

Following the space shuttle launch, Tate and Liza challenge Ash into a Double Battle, with Rachel refereeing the match. However, while trying to attack Ash's Pikachu and Swellow, both their Solrock and Lunatone's attacks keep cancelling each other out. As a result, the twins kept bickering more allowing Ash to score free hits. Eventually, they were able to patch up the mess, after stopping Team Rocket from stealing Solrock and Lunatone. As the battle resumes, both Tate and Liza countered most of Ash's tactics while in sync, but lose due to Pikachu and Swellow's "Thunder Armor" tactic. Both of them realized that they still need to improve their attack combinations and remain in sync with each other.

Voiced by (Japanese): Shō HayamiVoiced by (English): Sean Schemmel

Since Wallace was Hoenn Champion at the time, his mentor, Juan, served as the Water-type Gym Leader of Sootopolis City. Juan was a Top Coordinator in his early life and loves Water-type Pokémon due to their streamlined characteristics and weakness to Electric Types. He is widely popular amongst women and puts on spectacular water shows.

During his battle with Ash, the Gym battle was broken into two parts. The first part was a double battle. If the challenger defeats the two Gym Leaders' Pokémon, then they move on to the second part, which is a three on three battle.

His battle tactic is using rapid attacks making the opponent having trouble hitting the targets. Despite this, Juan loses to Ash and congratulates him on earning his eighth and final badge for the Hoenn League. He appears in a flashback in a Diamond and Pearl episode. As of Ultimate Journeys, since Wallace is confirmed to be the new Sootopolis Gym Leader, it is implied that Juan retired from his position.

Sinnoh Gym Leaders
The eight Sinnoh Gym Leaders and members of the Sinnoh League.

Voiced by (Japanese): Masataka Azuma; Satsuki Yukino (young)Voiced by (English): Craig Blair, Zoe Martin (young)

Roark is the Rock-type Gym Leader from Oreburgh City, foreman of the Oreburgh Mine and leader of the Ancient Pokémon Expedition Orienations. He inherited the Gym from his father, Byron, when Byron moved to Canaclave City, which would allowed Roark to further his own career. He first appeared in the show, where Paul was able to battle and defeat Roark easily, despite two of Paul's Pokémon were at a disadvantage. Ash later challenged Roark to a Gym battle, while Paul watched, but loses due to focusing too much on pleasing his rival and the fact that Roark's Cranidos wore out his team fast. Afterwards, Paul leaves disgusted with Ash's performance.

While training for a rematch, Roark provides Ash advice on using a strategy that Ash is familiar with, while reminding Ash that to win battles, concentrate on the current opponent and not the potential opponent. It is implied that Roark does not like Paul, as when Ash mentions about Paul's win, Roark felt uncomfortable stating that it "has been eating [him]". He helped Ash and his friends stop a rampagaing Aerodactyl and sent Team Rocket blasting off with his newly evolved Rampardos. The next day, Ash goes in for a rematch and violently defeats all of Roark's Pokémon, due to Roark being too slow in adapting to Ash's new tactics which included the improvised Spin Dodge and defense strategies.

Roark later appears during Ash's visit at Canalave City where Ash learns that Byron, the Canalave Gym Leader, was in fact, Roark's father. Both father and son defeated and stopped Team Rocket from stealing the fossils. Roark later refereed Ash's Gym Battle against Byron.

Roark's tactics are all about using fast and offense attacks. His signature Pokémon, Cranidos/ Rampardos, is capable of utilizing these tactics. However, he has poor defense tactics, which Byron always reminded Roark to use as well.

Voiced by (Japanese): Chieko HondaVoiced by (English): Lara Starr Rigores

The Eterna City Gym Leader and a Grass-type Specialist, Gardenia always gets overenthusiastic when coming across a Grass-type Pokémon, such as James' Cacnea and Carnivine and Ash's Turtwig, causing her to cuddle them a lot much to the Pokémon's displeasure. She first appeared in Eterna Forest arc, when Ash and friends help Cheryl reach the Combee hive. Ash had a practice battle with Gardenia, but forfeited as her skills were too overwhelming. She later appeared to help stop Team Rocket from stealing the Adamant Orb, while clearing Nando, who was framed for the crime. This is where Gardenia reveals herself as Gym Leader. Shortly after, Gardenia then got to battle Ash in an official Gym battle, where he merged victorious.

Gardenia appeared one last time where she and James engaged in a Tag Battle against Ash and Dawn, but lost. During the battle, Gardenia reveals that Cacnea can learn Drain Punch and offers to train Cacnea to make it stronger, to which James refused. However, because James did not properly train Cacnea and felt insecure, it could not execute Drain Punch properly. After consideration, he tearfully gave away his Cacnea to Gardenia to master the Drain Punch move. It is later revealed by Barry that she was successful, much to James' joy.

Gardenia's tactics is to rely on sunlight to make her Pokémon's moves powerful. However, due to over relying on the sunlight, she ended up costing her Gym Battle victory to Ash.

Voiced by (Japanese): Aya EndōVoiced by (English): Rachel Lillis

Maylene is the Fighting Gym Leader from Veilstone City. Six months prior to her debut appearance, Maylene became a Gym Leader, due to being a formidable opponent alongside her Lucario. However, due to the stress and new responsibilities and duties she had to carry out, she ended up losing focus too often. When Paul defeated Maylene easily due to both type-advantage and her lack of concentration, Paul called her "the weakest Gym leader [he's] ever fought."

Maylene bonded with Dawn as the two were struggling throughout their careers but they decided to battle to give each other confidence, while Ash went to train with Paul's older brother, Reggie. After Dawn loses to Maylene, Maylene battled Ash next. Although the battle ended in a draw, she gave Ash the win. This is the only time where Ash's Sinnoh Gym battle ended in a tie. She returns one last time to help Ash and the gang stop Team Galactic from stealing the Veilstone City Meteorites. It appears that she might have feelings for Reggie as he is nice to Maylene, unlike Paul.

Voiced by (Japanese): Tetsu InadaVoiced by (English): David Brimmer

The Water-type Gym Leader from Pastoria City, Crasher Wake is also a professional wrestler. He first appeared in the anime where he brings Ash, Dawn and Brock to the Pastoria Crogaunk Festival, as he is serving as one of the judges there. Fortunately, he accepted Ash's challenge for the following day. When it was time for the Gym battle, Ash was able to use Pikachu and Buizel to take out all three of Crasher Wake's Pokémon easily.

Crasher Wake is the only Sinnoh Gym Leader Ash was able to defeat without losing his own Pokémon in battle. Crasher Wake's Pokémon have a large amount of stamina, such as his Floatzel being able to use his floatation sac to stop various oncoming moves including Giga Impact. Crasher Wake also uses the underwater portion of the battlefield for ambush tactics and sensing opponents above water.

Voiced by (Japanese): Kikuko InoueVoiced by (English): Erica Schroeder

Fantina is the Ghost-type Gym Leader of Hearthrome City and a former Top Coordinator. Much like in the games, although Ash and his friends visit Heathrome City early on in the series, Fantina was not available to battle and was often away training. Ash does not properly meet Fantina until he sees her training with Zoey for an upcoming contest. When Ash had a practice battle with Fantina, he was easily overwhelmed by her reliance on her favorite move, Hypnosis, which her Pokémon Gengar and Drifblim can use.

Sometime later, Fantina returned to her Gym to make up for not doing Gym battles, as Paul revealed to have won his badge from her. She also battled Barry, who forfeited his match as he failed to knock out one of her Pokémon. When it was time for her showdown with Ash, it is revealed that Ash developed a "Counter Shield" tactic which was capable of both blocking and injuring opponents. He wipes the smirk off Fantina's face and defeats her by using "Counter Shield" along with close range attacks, much to Barry's amazement while watching the battle. Fantina later appears as a judge for the Sinnoh Grand Festival.

Her battle style is all about relying on moves that cause status conditions such as Hypnosis. However, because of her over reliance on her signature move, Hypnosis, as well as her poorly developed "Counter-Counter Shield", she loses to Ash.

Voiced by (Japanese): Kazuki YaoVoiced by (English): Dan Green

Byron is the Canaclave Gym Leader, Steel-type specialist and father of Roark. Originally, Byron used to run the Oreburgh Gym, but moved to Canaclave City, as there were more fossils located there and a vacant spot in the Gym opened up. His reason for letting Roark inheriting the Oreburgh Gym was for Roark to develop his own career. Despite his tough demeanour, Byron does love his son and his unseen wife and even kept the Sunkern Fossil, which Roark discovered as a child.

In his debut, he was in the middle of a family feud with Roark, while Ash arrives in the Gym. Roark calls out his father on his absence, which resulted in a feud becoming an intense showdown (Roark's Rampardos vs Byron's Bastiodon) of which Fossil Pokémon is the best and which tactic was better (offense vs. defense). Fortunately, the battle stopped when Team Rocket stole all of his fossil collection. Both father and son teamed up and defeated them. Byron then got to battle Ash, while Roark refereed, only for Ash to merge victorious.

Byron's tactics are primarily defence tactics and his signature Pokémon, Bastiodon, is capable of blocking oncoming attacks. However, due to poor offense tactics, he loses to Ash. Byron has bad judgement of character as he compliments Team Rocket on digging holes well enough to not be villains. Fortunately, Roark tells his father that Team Rocket are bad as they stole Byron's fossil collection.

Voiced by (Japanese): Noriko ShitayaVoiced by (English): Kether Donohue

Candice is the Ice-type Gym Leader of Snowpoint City. Despite her title, few challengers came to her hometown for a Gym battle. As a result, she works as a teacher at the Pokémon school for the most part. She is a childhood friend of Zoey and each had nicknames. Zoey calls Candice "Miss Senior" as they went to school together, while Candice calls Zoey . She appears to be fond of the word, "kiai", and places it in sentences. When they were young, both Zoey and Candice both took care of a young homeless Glameow that would later become Zoey's main Pokémon partner. Candice greets Ash and friends when they arrived in Snowpoint City and asks Ash to help her class as Candice's assistant teacher.

She is excited about a challenger coming to her city and eagerly accepts Ash's Gym Challenge the next day, while Zoey and her friends watched. Candice's tactics consisted a barrage of close range physical attacks and defense strategies to overcome type disadvantages. Despite this, she loses to Ash. Shortly after Ash won, Paul showed up to challenge Candice. Unfortunately, as Ash had his Gym battle, Candice postponed it to a later day, which Paul accepts without question. She later watches Paul battle Brandon, where Paul loses due to letting his anger get the better of him. She has made a few cameo appearances watching Zoey and Dawn compete through various contests.

Voiced by (Japanese): Hirofumi Nojima; Daisuke Sakaguchi (young)Voiced by (English): Eli James (Diamond & Pearl), Griffin Puatu (Journeys)

Volkner is the Electric-type Gym Leader from Sunyshore City. In his early life, he spent it on mostly battling poachers and gangs on the streets. At some point, he met his rival, Flint, where they battled and later became friends following a victory against a Proprietor. While Flint became the member of the Sinnoh Elite Four, Volkner took on the job as Gym Leader. He is also an electronic engineer as he designed automated walkways, multiple solar panels and Sunyshore Tower which is in fact the city's power plant. Although a skilled battler, he grew disinterested in his victories and just gave away his Beacon Badges for free.

Palmer mentioned that Volkner would give Ash "a shock" in battle, while Paul mentioned that the Gym was illegitimate, as Barry got his Beacon Badge without a proper battle. When Volkner refused to battle Ash, Ash decided to battle Flint in an exhibition battle. Because of Flint's victory, Volkner immediately decided to accept Ash's official Gym Challenge. However, the battle was interrupted, due to Team Rocket stealing the Sunyshore Tower. Both Ash and Volkner defeated Team Rocket with the help of Ash's newly evolved Torterra. Despite the success, the tower was badly damaged and Volkner had to repair it.

Sometime later, after the Grand Festival, the heroes returned to Sunyshore City for the final Sinnoh Gym match. Volkner showed off his defense strategies and close range attack tactics in battle but finally loses to Ash when Ash's Infernape finally mastered its Blaze ability. With Ash's final win, Volkner and Flint congratulate Ash on his victory.

Volkner returns in the Journeys anime as he is participating in the World Coronation series and reunites with Ash. While he does put a good fight, he lost to Ash again when Pikachu used his Z-move against Volkner's Electivire, causing his rank to drop. He along with Flint later watched Cynthia's battle against Iris.

Unova Gym Leaders
The Unova region has a total of 11 gyms shown from both the Black and White games and Black 2 and White 2 games. With the exception of Drayden, Marlon and Cheren, Ash was able to defeat and earn eight Unova Gym badges out of the eleven gyms shown. For information on Cilan, see the main protagonists section. Iris is not listed here as she is not a Gym Leader, but a travelling companion and Unova Champion in the anime.

, 
Chili voiced by: Masakazu Morita (Japanese), Lucien Dodge (English)
Cress voiced by: Makoto Ishii (Japanese), Tom Wayland (English)

Chili and Cress are Cilan's brothers. Cilan, Chili and Cress are triplets, waiters and own a restaurant that doubles as a Gym in Striaton City. When Ash arrived for his Gym Battle challenge, he is given the option to battle one of the three brothers. Ash decided to face all three of them and their Pokémon, Pansage, Pansear and Panpour, with two victories for one side as winner. Although Ash lost to Cress, Ash defeated both Chili and Cilan, earning his first Unova Gym Badge. Inspired by the battle, Cilan decided to travel with Ash while Chili and Cress had to take care of their gym.

Sometime later, a C-class Connoisseuse named Burgundy attempted to challenge Cilan to a rematch, having lost to him. Upon learning that Cilan went travelling with Ash, Burgundy attempt to find Cilan for a rematch, only to lose again to him. It is revealed that Burgundy defeated Chili in a Gym Battle.

Later when Ash, Cilan and Iris were at Driftveil City, Chili and his Pansear ran away from the Striaton Gym and met with Cilan. It is revealed that Chili has been losing a lot, due to using too much offense tactics and not enough defense tactics and all four of Pansear's Fire-type moves are not capable of covering its weakness against Water, Ground or Rock. Cilan taught Chili's Pansear a new move, Solar Beam to counter the weakness.

After appearing in a few fantasy sequences and flashbacks, Chili and Cress appear one last time in the Decolore Islands arc. They had a nasty run in with Morana, an Ice-type trainer from Sinnoh and a dojo breaker. If the Gym Leader loses to her in a battle, then their Gym was hers. Although she defeated Chili and Cress, she had to face off against Cilan and tracked his whereabouts, with Cilan's brothers following as well. Cilan was able to defeat Morana and maintain the ownership of the Striaton Gym. Afterwards, Chili and Cress went home to Unova while Cilan, Iris and Ash head off to Kanto.

Voiced by (Japanese): Atsuko TanakaVoiced by (English): Norma Nongauza

Lenora is a paleontologist and Normal-type Gym Leader from Nacrene City. She also works at the Nacrene Museum as a director, alongside her husband, Hawes, who is assistant director. Many trainers who attempted to challenge Lenora were required to search for a book that would help them out. Unknown to many challengers, she wanted them to find the book that will grant them access to the Gym battlefield. However, as many people wanted to find books they were interested in or can read through quickly, they failed her test before the battle could even begin.

She first appears in the series stopping a rampaging Yamask who was trying to reclaim its lost mask. Once the ordeal was done, she then gave Ash the challenge to find a book that would help him become a better trainer. He does so and he gets to earn the right to face Lenora. Unlike most Gym Leaders, Lenora is allowed to switch her Pokémon out. Her tactic is to disorient her opponents using a combination of Roar from Lillipup in the first battle and Herdier in the rematch (which causes the opponent's Pokémon to switch out) and Watchog's Mean Look (which prevents the trainer from switching out their Pokémon). Because of this tactic, Ash ended up losing his battle to her.

Sometime after training with Don George, Ash returns to the Gym for a rematch. This time, Ash was able to adapt to Lenora's disorientation tactic and successfully defeats her.

Voiced by (Japanese): Tōru FuruyaVoiced by (English): Billy Bob Thompson

Burgh is the Bug-type Gym Leader from Castelia City, a fashion designer and an artist. Even since he was child, he was fascinated with Bug-type Pokémon and was able to interact with them and learn about their behavior as a result. In his debut appearance, Ash and friends encountered Burgh in Pinwheel Forest. He shows Ash how to interact with Bug-types when Ash was attempting to bond with a Sewaddle, which later became Ash's.

Later, when the group met Burgh in his hometown, there was a Venipede infestation. Burgh was angry that the mayor of Castelia City planned to forcibly remove them. Burgh suggested to find the leader and heal the leader so that the Venipede could leave in peace. The Venipede were successfully drive out, with a help of Burgh's Bug Flute, and Ash and co.'s aid. Shortly after the ordeal, Professor Juniper arrived and Ash and friends decided to accompany her to the Desert Resort. This would have led to the Team Rocket vs. Team Plasma two-parter but the two episodes were cancelled due to the 2011 Tohoku Earthquake and the Fukushima Nuclear Disaster. The dub removed the reference to the Desert Resort and the episode ended with Ash looking forward to his Gym battle.

Ash battled Burgh for the third Gym Badge. With the help of both his Pikachu and Sewaddle/Swadloon, Ash merged victorious.

Voiced by (Japanese): Yumiko KobayashiVoiced by (English): Eileen Stevens

Elesa is the Electric-type Gym Leader from Nimbasa City and a famous fashion model. In her debut episode, Elesa was working at a fashion show displaying multiple outfits while walking down the runway, while Ash, Iris, Cilan and Bianca watched. Upon noticing Ash's Pikachu, she jumps off the runway and gets to meet the group up close, as she has never seen a Pikachu before. Bianca first challenges Elesa but loses easily when Elesa's Zebstrika stomped all three of Bianca's Pokémon. Elesa and Ash also convinced Bianca's father to allow her to continue becoming a Pokémon Trainer.

Later, Ash gets to battle Elesa next. Despite a series of mishaps, Ash ends up winning. Elesa does admit that she forgot that a strong bond between Pokémon and trainer is key to victories rather than dazzling and showing off to the crowd.

Her Gym has a built in roller coaster that grants the challengers access to the battlefield. In addition, Elesa has multiple female fans watching her Gym battles, some of which cosplay as her.

Voiced by (Japanese): Tsuguo MogamiVoiced by (English): Sean Schemmel

Clay is the Ground-type Gym Leader from Driftveil City and CEO of a mining industry. As a child, he and his Pokémon, Excadrill, made a living working in the mines digging for various resources. Many years later, the mine would later become the Driftveil City Gym and also earned him the title, "King of the Mines." Clay does not approve of people using "unfair strategies" such as Ash using his Snivy's Attract on Clay's Palpitoad, despite being a legit strategy, preferring full frontal assault. Clay also reminds challengers that reaching a goal in life is not easy and that hard work is the only way to achieve it. 

Clay first met Ash and co. briefly but could not battle Ash, due to work and a discovery of a new tunnel. The second time Ash tried to challenge Clay, he was turned down, but Clay sent Ash to a nearby island to get several sacks of Revival Herbs to make the Pokémon work healthily in the mines. He does accept Ash's challenge when Ash fulfills the request and thus earned the right for a Gym Challenge. Despite his efforts and head-on tactics, Clay loses the battle, but encourages Ash to continue on with his goal of becoming a Pokémon master.

Voiced by (Japanese): Kana UedaVoiced by (English): Sarah Natochenny

The Flying-type Gym Leader from Mistralton City, Skyla inherited the Gym from her grandfather, Miles. While she was a skilled trainer, she had no time for other hobbies such as flying her plane, due to countless challengers coming to her gym. To resolve this problem, she created "Air Battles." The battles were more based on theory. If a challengers' Pokémon have positive type matchups, then they earn the badge without a proper battle. If not, then they do not earn the badge. She had been using it a lot, although it was highly disapproved of by Miles and Cilan. Cilan tried to challenge her into a battle to prove her air battle theories were wrong but loses, based on Skyla's predictions in terms of type matchup.

Ash then challenged Skyla into a battle, which she accepts as the other challengers wanted to watch how an actual battle plays out. Although Skyla predicted that Ash would lose easily, she ends up losing due to Ash's newly evolved Unfezant and her own overconfidence. Afterwards, Skyla decided to drop the Air Battle habit and not take the battles too lightly.

Voiced by (Japanese): Nobuo TobitaVoiced by (English): Benjamin Becker

Brycen is the Ice-type Gym Leader from Icirrus City. Originally, he was once a famous movie star who had many leading roles in movies. However, an accident on set forced Brycen to retire from acting during production of another movie and he later became a Gym-Leader. He trains in the mountains and sets up traps for any poachers. He first appears in the series helping Ash train in the mountains and stops a Pokémon poacher from capturing a Volcarona.

Brycen then battled Ash at the Gym. Although he had multiple counter-strategies for type disadvantages, he loses to Ash. Once Ash earned his seventh badge, Brycen suggested to head to Opelucid City for his final Gym badge, which does not sit too well with Iris. Unbeknownst to Brycen, the Opelucid Gym was closed which meant that Ash has to go somewhere else.

Voiced by (English): Alyson Leigh RosenfeldVoiced by (Japanese): Eri Kitamura

Roxie is the Poison-type Gym Leader from Virbank City and the bass guitarist for her punk rock band, Koffing and the Toxics. Originally, Ash was going to go to Opelucid City for his eighth badge, but because the Gym was closed there, Ash went to Virbank City instead. Unlike in the games where she's the second Gym Leader, Roxie serves as Ash's final Unova Gym Leader to beat. Her Gym is a large concert hall where loud music plays affecting a trainer's concentration. One of the most dangerous tactics Roxie uses is to poison her opponents, regardless of type advantage, and had defeated multiple challengers with that tactic. Her Gym battles consists of Roxie using three Poison-types while the challenger is allowed to use all Pokémon on hand. Despite her poison tactics, she loses to Ash.

Her Koffing was revealed to have been caught by Roxie when she hosted a concert in the Kanto region. She is quite excited to meet Ash as he and his Pikachu were also revealed to be from the Kanto region as well. Roxie also likes to put on a solid performance and believes in fair play, when she gives Ash's Pignite a Pecha berry to cure him of his poisoning after defeating her Scolipede.

Voiced by (Japanese): Masaki TerasomaVoiced by (English): Mike Pollock

Drayden is the Dragon-type Gym Leader of Opelucid City. In a flashback, Iris and her Excadrill first Drayden when he visited her hometown, Village of Dragons. Iris attempted to battle him, only to suffer a bad loss, due to her arrogance. He's the reason why Excadrill disobeyed Iris, as Excadrill feared he failed her. Fortunately, Iris and Excadrill were able to make amends.

Ash originally planned on facing Drayden but because Drayden was away from his Gym, Ash went elsewhere for his final Gym badge. Drayden is one of the two Gym Leaders Ash never faces in battle (the other was Marlon).

It is revealed that he is also the head of Opelucid Academy, the same school where Iris attended. Iris had a tough time there as she did not know how to fit in the school and was reprimanded by Drayden for not realizing she wore out a rented Fraxure during a practice battle. However, Drayden had faith in Iris as he plans on having her inherit the Opelucid Gym but after she goes on a journey first. He has a battle with Iris and wins again.

He returns in Journeys, where he meets Ash again and watches his World Coronation Series battle against Iris. Later, Drayden watched Iris' match against Cynthia.

Voiced by (Japanese): Yūji UedaVoiced by (English): Ted Lewis

Marlon is the Water-type Gym Leader from Humilau City. He only appeared in one episode, where Cameron had to earn his eighth and final Gym Badge. He first met Cameron and Ash when the two were lost in the city looking for the gym. Fortunately, he gave the two a ride on his Wailord to the Gym, where Iris and Cilan were waiting. Once they arrived, Marlon battled Cameron. Despite using his strong Water-type Pokémon, offense tactics and the water arena to his advantage, Marlon lost to Cameron. As a result, Cameron has earned his final badge for his entry in the Unova League. Marlon is one of the two Gym Leaders Ash never faces as Ash already earned his eight Unova Gym Badges.

Voiced by (Japanese): Takuya EguchiVoiced by (English): Todd Haberkorn

Cheren is the new Normal-type Gym Leader from Aspertia City. Unlike in the games, he is not a rival of Ash, and is already a teacher at the Pokémon school. He was first mentioned by Professor Juniper, who informed Ash and co. about the new Gym Leader, shortly after the Unova League.

In his actual appearance, he helped the heroes to round up the School's Pokémon that ran out of control and wild due to Pikachu and Axew messing with the intercoms. He was able to calm down a scared Shinx despite getting electrocuted. Afterwards, he and Ash had an unofficial Gym battle match where Cheren merged victorious. He is the only Normal-type Gym Leader Ash never rematched, as Ash already earned his eight Unova badges and Cheren's badge is the Basic Badge, just like Lenora's.

Kalos Gym Leaders
The eight Kalos Gym Leaders are official members of the Kalos League. Unlike the previous series, all eight Gym Leaders banded together to help Ash and friends defeat Team Flare. For information on Clemont, see his information under main protagonists.
 

Voiced by (Japanese): Noriko ShitayaVoiced by (English): Lori Gardner
 
Viola is the Bug-type Gym Leader of Santalune City, a professional photographer and the younger sister of Alexa, the Kalos journalist Ash met during the Decolore Islands arc. Viola was first mentioned by Alexa in the last episode of the Black and White anime and was mentioned in the first XY episode, where she was away from her gym. She did not make an official appearance until Ash's arrival at Santalune City, where she photograph Ash and Pikachu near a fountain. When Ash attempted to battle her, he loses easily due to Viola's trap tactics which counters both Pikachu and Fletchling's type advantage. Unbeknownst to Ash, Viola admitted to Alexa that she felt disappointed in Ash's performance. Alexa responds by warning Viola that there are no repeat performances in a rematch.
 
When Ash goes back for a rematch, he was able to adapt to most of her tactics, but Viola's Vivillon knew Sleep Powder (which was never used in the first battle) to defeat Ash's Fletchling. During the Gym Battle rematch, Viola acts dismissive towards Ash, feeling that he had no chance of winning. Fortunately, with a bit of encouragement from Serena, Ash merged victorious, giving Viola a reality check. She reappeared in the Battle Chateau where she runs into Ash and pals and battles Grant, where she loses easily. She does make a few cameo appearances and teams up with Ash to help stop Team Flare. She seems to have feelings for Grant, which is reciprocated.
 

Voiced by (Japanese): Hirofumi Nojima Voiced by (English): Cory Willis
 
Grant is a professional athlete, specifically in rock-climbing, as well as the Rock-type Gym Leader of Cyllage City. Ash first met him at the Battle Chateau, where he was able to defeat Viola and her Surskit. Afterwards, he heads back to his Gym, but not before telling Ash that he will wait for him at his Gym to battle. It appears that he has feelings for Viola, which is reciprocated.
 
Later on, when Ash arrives in the Gym, Grant accepts his challenge. Grant's philosophy is that climbing walls is a way of letting a person reach enlightenment, as long as they focus on reaching the goal. This was demonstrated when Ash had to climb up the walls inside his Gym to reach the battlefield on the top, while Ash's friends took the elevator. For the battle, Ash is allowed to use all of his Pokémon on hand, while Grant has to use two. Although a strong battler and his Tyrunt took out two of Ash's Pokémon (Froakie and Fletchling), he loses to Ash and Pikachu as Ash developed a counterstrategy against Grant's Rock Tomb and Draco Meteor attacks. Afterwards, before Ash heads off to Shalour City, Grant hoped to refight Ash at the Battle Chateau, which ended up never actually happening. He does make a few cameos and helps Ash defeat Team Flare.
 

Voiced by (Japanese): Yuka TerasakiVoiced by (English): Lisa Ortiz
 
Korrina is the Shalour City Gym Leader, who specializes in Fighting-type Pokémon and rides around on roller skates. With the exception of Clemont, who is Ash's main Kalos companion, Korrina is also the only Kalos Gym Leader who briefly travelled with Ash and pals. Her main Pokémon is Lucario, who is capable of Mega-evolving. Within her debut series, she gets help from Ash and friends to search for a Lucarionite, a Mega-evolution stone for her Lucario, which they found successfully and they were able to Mega-evolve her Lucario. However, due to arrogance and failing to understand her Lucario being too battle obsessed, her Mega-Lucario goes out of control and violently attacks his own allies. She had to go up to Pomace Mountain, where Mabel and her Mawile, capable of Mega-evolving, showed her how to be in sync through developing floral designs. Eventually, Korrina was able to master her Mega-evolution. Afterwards, she returned to Shalour City to prepare herself for the Gym Battle. Ash was able to defeat Korrina in a Gym battle with Pikachu defeating Mega-Lucario. She shows up in a few cameos and helped Ash defeat Team Flare.
 
In Pokémon Journeys, Korrina was revealed to be competing in the Battle Festival to take a shot at facing Leon and reunites with Ash and meeting his Riolu. Although she was able to defeat Ash's Gengar with her Mienshao and somewhat adapt to Ash's tactics, it was not enough for her, as Ash defeats her Mienshao and her Mega-Lucario again with Dragonite. She was later mentioned by Bea in a later episode, where Bea reveals that she defeated Korrina off screen. Korrina appears later on in the show as to provide Ash a Key Stone and helping him head to Mega Island to search for a Lucarionite for his Lucario as it was to apologize to fans for not giving Ash access to Mega-evolution in favour of Ash-Greninja and Generation VI only Pokémon in the XY series. She later came to Galar to watch Ash's battle against Bea. Korrina, alongside her grandfather Gurkinn and Bea, would then watch Ash's match against Leon.
 

Voiced by (Japanese): Minoru InabaVoiced by (English): Tony Salerno
 
Ramos is the Grass-type Gym Leader of Coumarine City. He owns a Grass-type Pokémon ranch and is a gardener. Despite his old age, he is wise and provides Ash advice on how to deal with situations such as not to rush into problems and find the "side road" to solve the problems. His tactic is all about patience and uses a combination of defence tactics and sunlight to power up his Grass-types. He first met Ash and pals when they accidentally broke a fence in his ranch and helps them defeat Team Rocket when they abducted all three members of the Vanillite line. At the end of his debut episode, he reveals himself to be the Grass-type Gym Leader and was looking forward for his battle with Ash.
 
He got to battle Ash after they enjoy some tea and do some gardening. Remembering what Ramos said about not to rush things during the gardening, Ash took this advice and was able to defeat Ramos in a Gym Battle. Ramos also appeared in the following episode when the city was having its annual Coumarine City Festival. He later made a few cameos and aids Ash in stopping Team Flare.
 

Voiced by (English): Kate BristolVoiced by (Japanese): Satsuki Yukino
 
Valerie is the Fairy-type Gym Leader of Laverre City and a famous fashion designer who always wanted to be a Pokémon. Her Gym also operates as a fashion show and a fashion boutique which sells women's clothing with Pokémon patterns. The Furisode Girls serve as her employees not just for the fashion show but for gym battles. Serena is a huge fan of Valerie as she always wanted to meet her in person. In her debut appearance, Valerie was hosting a fashion show which meant that all Gym Battle requests were cancelled at the moment. When two of her models could not show up in time for the show, Valerie hired Serena and Bonnie as replacements. After the fashion show, she challenges Sawyer into a Gym battle and easily defeated him due to Sawyer's mistake of using a Dragon-type Bagon against her Fairy-type Spritzee. Unlike most Gym Leaders, Valerie does not meet Ash face to face until her second appearance, when Ash arrives to challenge her to a Gym battle. Although she puts up a good fight, she loses to Ash. She made a few cameo appearances since and shows up in the Team Flare arc where she helps Ash save Kalos.
 
Her tactics primarily consist of using unexpected attacks and twisting the battlefield into her advantage, which she describes as "hidden fangs". Many trainers, prior to Ash, lost because of this strategy. She is also capable of speaking the Fairy-type Pokémon language. Valerie admires Ash as he mentions that he can understand how a Pokémon can feel, when she asked if he could talk to them as well during the Gym battle.
 

Voiced by (Japanese): Masako KatsukiVoiced by (English): Catrin Lloyd Bollard
 
Olympia is the Psychic-type Gym Leader from Anistar City, as well as a Psychic mentor for her students. She has psychic powers that allow her to see visions of the past as well as the future as well as levitation. Olympia was first mentioned in the series by Tierno, who tried to battle her but lost the match. In her debut appearance, she and one of her apprentices, Charlene, furiously stop and scold her other apprentice, Carrie, for attacking Professor Sycamore and his research crew, alongside Ash and pals due to Carrie misinterpreting the prophecy involving the main characters. Once everything was cleared up, Olympia reveals Ash's Frogadier past and what the future would hold for the two. She later engages in a Gym battle with Ash, using both her male and female Meowstic. Despite her tactics of using deadly move combinations, Ash realized that Olympia was reusing the same attack combinations and, with careful timing, successfully defeated her.
 
She briefly appeared later on in the show, informing Diantha about the upcoming disaster. Olympia later assisted Ash in the battle against the Giant Rock, which was heading for the Anistar City sundial, which would destroy the world if the Giant Rock made contact with it.
 

Voiced by (Japanese): Ryūzaburō Ōtomo Voiced by (English): David Brimmer
 
Wulfric is the Ice-type gym leader from Snowbelle City. Ash first encounters him after Sawyer earned his final Gym badge for the Kalos League. While Ash puts up a good fight, he loses to Wulfric, as Ash was unable to master the Ash-Greninja technique. Wulfric explained that the loss was due to Ash having severe trust issues with his Greninja.
 
Sometime later, Ash returned for his rematch after mastering the Ash-Greninja tactic and learning how to stop doubting himself in his Pokémon. This time, Wulfric loses to Ash, despite Mega-evolving his Abomasnow. He later helped Ash defeat Team Flare.
 
Wulfric is impatient and eager to battle, despite the referee being needed to explain the rules. He does have some speaking problems, usually starting sentences with, "You know what...". Like many Gym Leaders, he wants to see full potential in the challengers.

Galar Gym Leaders
The Gym Leaders of Galar. Unlike the previous series and because of his status of being the Alolan Champion, Ash is not competing in the Galar Region League, and is instead competing in the World Coronation Series to face against Leon. As of the Journeys series, Milo, Nessa, Kabu, Melony, Gordie and Bede have yet to appear in the series. For more information on Marnie, see her information under Rivals.

Voiced by (Japanese): Yoko HikasaVoiced by (English): Tiana Camacho

Bea is an expert of Galar Karate and a fierce warrior of a Fighting Gym Leader, Bea is a determined fighter who rarely displays her emotions. She has an accurate sense of battle strategies and always remains calm even when facing a crisis. However, in spite of her calmness and tough looking exterior, Bea has a huge sweet tooth. While she tried to keep her love of sweets a secret, her fans eventually found out, which resulted in her having more trouble trying to indulge herself.

Bea was considered as a prodigy in Galar Karate as mentioned by Chuck, the Cianwood Gym Leader, when he mentioned studying Galar Karate under her father when he visited Galar. Bea once had a battle against Korrina in which she came out victorious.

Ash challenged her to a battle, once. Bea used Grapploct and Hawlucha, while Ash used Riolu and Farfetch'd. However, both of her Pokémon were undefeated and Bea came victorious. The coordination of their fighting stances, plus fast reflexes, and pure strength, makes her a devastating and brutal opponent.

Bea was last spotted in Cianwood City, her rank rose to 193. Ash then demanded a rematch, to which Bea accepted. Bea kept her Grapploct, and switched Hawlucha for Hitmontop. Ash kept his Riolu, and switched Farfetch'd for Pikachu. After a tough battle, the match ended in a draw, which meant that there were no changes in ranking. Following the battle, Bea and her Pokémon surprised Ash and Goh who were shocked to see her eat the desserts offered by Chuck, she later states to Ash the next time they face each other will be in the Ultra Class. Both Ash and Bea competed against each other in the Ultra Class where Ash wins by using his Mega Lucario to defeat her Gigantamax Machamp. Afterwards, Bea fully acknowledges and respects Ash's growth and finally refers to him by his real name instead of "Riolu Trainer" and later "Lucario Trainer." Bea returns when Ash is on his quest to find the Max Mushrooms to Gigantamax Gengar. It's also revealed that she is friends with Allister, as both are from Stow-on-Side. Bea, along with Korrina, would later watch Ash's match against Leon. She later has a practice battle with Hop, while Leon referees the match.

Although Bea has a stern exterior, she is actually a sweet person when she smiles, indicating that she can be outwardly nice to trusted ones. A speculation on why she rarely smiles is that her strict parents had posed an emotional burden on her during her childhood. It has also been stated that she lost her smile due to her parents' strict training. Additionally, it is implied that few people have seen Bea smile, one of which is the player character following their Gym Battle with her.

Voiced by (Japanese): Tatsuhisa Suzuki (JN027-45), Yoshitsugu Matsuoka (JN82-current)Voiced by (English): Danny Kramer

Raihan is a Dragon-type Gym Leader from Hammerlocke. His main Pokémon is a Duraludon which is capable of Gigantamaxing. Much like fellow Gym Leader Bea, Raihan entered the World Coronation series to face Leon. He was the 7th strongest trainer in the Master Class. However, it is revealed that his rank had dropped to 8th place as Flint was ranked 7 in the Masters 8 but then dropped to 8th place but at some point dropped his rank even further. His battle style is mainly weather manipulation which he can use to give himself an advantage to power up his Pokémon.

He first appeared in the series to face off against Leon and his Charizard using Duraludon only to lose. Afterwards, Raihan vowed to train harder to face off against Leon once more. Later on the series, he later appeared in the Darkest Day arc to help Sonia to stop the rampaging Eternatus and the out of control Dynamaxed Pokémon. He later competes in a cake baking competition where he loses to Ash. Raihan served as Ash's final opponent in the Hyper Class before Ash enters the Masters 8 where Raihan lost the match. He later watched Ash's battle against Leon.

Voiced by (Japanese): Yoshino OtoriVoiced by (English): Marin Miller

In the past, Opal was a beautiful woman with black hair, fair skin, and a pretty nose. In the present day, however, Opal is now old, wrinkled, and has white hair.

70 years prior, Opal became the Gym Leader of Ballonlea, taking over from her mother. But now in her elderly years, she feels that she has reached her limits and decides to find herself an apprentice. To this end, her Gym Challenge takes the form of an audition. Though worthy challengers usually pass the battle parts to meet her in the stadium, Opal is also secretly judging their potential to become the next Ballonlea Gym Leader by the amount of "pink" they possess, based not only on appearance, personality or Pokémon, but by another personal standard that she never discloses outright. Her records backstage are filled to the brim with papers of challengers who got through the battle part but failed the audition, including those of Leon and Sonia, suggesting that she has been conducting this Gym Challenge format for a long time with no prospective candidate in sight.

Opal loves seeing the color pink and will stop at nothing to find an apprentice. She can be rather forceful in that respect, since she will insist on having that person do what she wants regardless of their stand on the matter. She has a penchant of deliberately giving out tricky quizzes as well, claiming that they can make people reveal their true colors in a pinch. Many speculate however, that she does so merely out of spite.

In her debut, she made Ash and Goh take part in a trivia contest and are forced to wear pink outfits every time they get a question wrong. However, she was making the two wait patiently, while waiting for Chloe to return to the gang with the help of Galarian Ponyta and Rapidash. She later returns hosting a cake-decorating contest, where she serves as host and judge and declares Ash the winner for creative taste and unique decorations. Because of this, she challenges Ash into a battle only to call it off after Ash's Pikachu gets "Feastamaxed" from eating Gigantamax Alcremie's cream.

Voiced by (Japanese): Chiyuki MiuraVoiced by (English): Ryan Bartley

Allister is the Ghost-type Gym Leader from Stow-on-Side, the same city where Bea hails from. He is shy and wears a white ghost mask over his face. Despite his creepy appearance and soft voice, he does have a caring side.

Allister first appears in the series where he is riding on a ghost train, while helping Goh drive Spiritomb out of Ash's body. He appears again to help Ash Gigantamax his Gengar. When Ash was only able to Dynamax his Gengar the first time, Allister tells Ash that the only way to unlock the Gigantamax Gengar form was to look for Max Mushrooms and convert it into a soup. Ash was able to get all the Mushrooms required and is able to Gigantamax his Gengar for the first time. Allister is also revealed to friends with Bea. He also makes a few cameo appearances, watching Ash's battles against Marnie and Leon and listening to Team Rocket's radio show.

Voiced by (Japanese): Hiro ShimonoVoiced by (English): Howard Wang
 
Piers is the Dark-type Gym Leader from Spikemuth, leader of Team Yell and the older brother of Marnie. When Ash went to battle Marnie, he was tricked into going to Spikemuth by Team Yell, which is Marnie's fan club. Piers gets annoyed that Team Yell were causing this problem, hinting that they do that often. After everything gets cleared up, he was able to drive Ash to Wyndon Stadium for his official World Coronation series match on his motorcycle. Piers revealed that Spikemuth Gym cannot host World Coronation series matches as there are no power spots to Dynamax or Gigantamax as well as Marnie's motivation of becoming Champion- to make Spikemuth be revitalized again as the city is completely empty. Piers watches the match where Marnie loses, but the siblings congratulate Ash on his win. He, alongside Marnie and Team Yell, later got to watch Ash's showdown with Leon.
 
While Piers may look thuggish in terms of appearance, he is actually friendly and supportive of Marnie. He has low tolerance of Team Yell causing problems just to make Marnie look good such as getting upset when Ash mentions Team Yell's antics and Marnie scolding them for harassing Ash right before the match began. Piers is the only Team leader that is not a villain, unlike previous antagonistic groups.

Island Kahunas
The four Island Kahunas of Alola. In the Sun and Moon anime, Ash battles them to earn Z-Crystals to learn new Z-moves. Each of them first appeared in their own island arcs before becoming promoted to recurring characters. They also serve as referees for the Alola League.

Voiced by (English): Ryan AndesVoiced by (Japanese): Nobuyuki Hiyama
Hala is the Kahuna of Melemele Island, who uses Fighting-types. He has been a Kahuna for a long time ever since Professor Kukui was a child. At some point prior to Ash's arrival to Alola, he mentored Kukui and Guzma before Guzma grew disillusioned and ran off vowing to become strong without Hala's teachings or Z-rings or Crystals. While carefree, Hala is also wise and provides advice to many people. It is revealed that Tapu Koko also took one of Hala's Z-rings to give to Ash to inspire him to take on the Island challenges. Hala also has a grandson named Hau.

Within his debut appearance, Ash needed to find a way to get rid of the Alolan Rattata and Alolan Raticate infestation without the use of violence. This leads to Ash's first Island trial where he had to defeat the Totem Yungoos and Gumshoos, to convince them to help drive out the Rattata and Raticate. Because of this accomplishment, Ash was granted his first Grand Trial. This is where Ash learns about how Z-moves work in battle as well as being warned about proper timing and how using a Z-move can drain a lot of energy. Taking Kukui's advice, Ash was able to easily win against Hala. Afterwards, Hala threw a big party for Ash on his first Grand Trial accomplishments.

He has appeared frequently throughout later episodes since then such as participating in a Sled Jump Games while evolving his Crabrawler into a Crabominable, as well as appearing alongside the other Kahunas for the Alola League. He returns in Ultimate Journeys welcoming Lillie and her family back to Alola.

Voiced by (English): Marisa KennedyVoiced by (Japanese): Miyuki Sawashiro
Olivia is the Kahuna of Akala Island and specializes in Rock-type Pokémon. Kiawe mentioned that he challenged and defeated her in a Grand Trial, to inherit a Z-ring. She appears in person in "The Island Whisperer!", in which she takes Ash and his Pokémon School classmates to visit Akala Island. In "Treasure Hunt, Akala Style!", where she organizes a treasure hunt for the students on Akala. In "Big Sky, Small Fry!", she gives a Z-ring to Lana which is created from a sparkling stone Lana finds on the treasure hunt. In "Currying Favor and Flavor!", Olivia sends Ash and Mallow on a search for ingredients for the famous "Akala Curry". Their search eventually leading them to Lush Jungle, where Ash is challenged by Totem Lurantis. After Ash defeats Lurantis, Olivia reveals that the entire search had actually been a part of Ash's trial, and he is now qualified to take on her grand trial. "In Trials and Determinations!", Ash wins his grand trial against Olivia in a double battle. After the battle, Olivia gives Ash a Rockium Z. She has appeared frequently throughout the series and is one of the few female characters to have romantic feelings for Brock. Some of her known appearances in later episodes include helping serve customers at Mallow's restaurant.

Olivia constantly gets knocked to the ground over simple tasks like walking up the stairs or opening a door. She has a natural affinity even with highly guarded and aggressive Pokémon such as Kiawe's Turtonator and Ash's Litten. In the penultimate episode of the Sun and Moon series, when Ash was trying to find a new goal in life after becoming Alola Champion, Olivia advised Ash to go see the world to help further expand his skills. The reason for this is because fans found Ash doing the region League quests repetitive and boring and that Ash needs a different goal in life, now that he is Champion.

Voiced by (English): Michael McMillanVoiced by (Japanese): Masaki Aizawa
Nanu is the Kahuna of Ula'ula Island who specializes in Dark-types. He was once acquainted with Giovanni of Team Rocket, but, for unknown reasons, stopped his affiliation and became a police officer. He first appeared in the show giving Team Rocket a Z-power Ring to help save Acerola who was abducted by a Gengar nicknamed Greedy Rapooh. Ash then showed up to challenge Nanu for a grand trial only to lose due to his Dusk Lycanroc going berserk because of its dirty fur. Sometime after Lycanroc learned how to control its anger, Nanu then assigns Ash to a trial at the Thrifty Megamart where he had to battle Team Rocket and their Mimikyu in an official battle. Once accomplished, Nanu accepts Ash's Grand Trial Challenge. Here, Ash had to defeat all three of Nanu's Pokémon using only his Lycanroc, which Ash succeeds. Afterwards, Nanu gives Ash a Lycanium-Z crystal and does secretly admit to Acerola that he has some respect for Ash. He has made recurring appearances since then.

Nanu tends to relax and play with his kendama and tries to avoid challenges by pretending to be someone else. Despite this, he is a skilled battler using underhanded tactics such as mocking opponents as to bring out the best in them.

Voiced by (English): Brittney Lee HamiltonVoiced by (Japanese): Junko Takeuchi
Hapu is the Kahuna of Poni Island, who specializes in Ground-types as well as working as a farmer. Originally, there used to be an Island Kahuna prior to Hapu, but he officially retired due to declining health. In addition, her deceased grandfather, Sofu, also was revealed to be a former Island Kahuna at the time. She first appeared in the Poni Island arc, where she falsely accused and attacked Ash and friends for stealing her radishes. Upon learning that Team Skull were the ones causing trouble, she drove them off and slowly starts to open up to the gang.

After spending some time with the gang as well as battling Tapu Fini when the fog covered the island, her deceased grandfather returns as a ghost to inform Hapu that she is the next trainer to become an Island Kahuna. This is the first time where we get to see how an Island Kahuna Coronation works. She officially battled Ash in a Grand Island Trial but lost due to the mistake of giving Ash an environmental advantage. The battle arena the two fought on was surrounded by water which Ground-types could easily get soaked and left vulnerable to Electric attacks. Hapu has appeared alongside the other Kahunas frequently since then as well as giving Sophocles a Z-ring.

Elite Four and former Champions

Kanto Elite Four

Voiced by (English): Maddie BlausteinVoiced by (Japanese): Toshiyuki Morikawa

Bruno is the Fighting-type user of the Kanto Elite Four. He may be a stoic individual and devoted to hard work, but it is revealed that he is a dedicated and wise advisor such as believing in catching strong Pokémon to better themselves or meditate to hone his skills and wisdom.

In his debut, Ash and friends ran into some trouble in the form of a giant Onix running around. Both Ash and Brock wanted to learn from Bruno, which Bruno accepts. He has the two start doing chores around his place. At first, Bruno felt like a phony given that he did not have any secret techniques in training Pokémon. However, Bruno revealed his athletic prowess stopping the giant Onix, as well as remove the Sandslash that was stuck in its body. After fixing the problem, Bruno catches the Onix. It is then revealed that one of the keys to training Pokémon is to show care for each other between Trainer and Pokémon.

Voiced by (English): Jayne GrandVoiced by (Japanese): Maria Kawamura

Lorelei is the Ice-type user of the Elite Four in Kanto, but often relaxes in the Orange Islands. In her debut, Ash and friends meet her at a cafe and Lorelei invites the group to her lecture and battle demonstration. Here, Ash was struggling with his disobedient Charizard, forcing Lorelei to use her Slowbro to make Ash recall it. Ash then got to face off against Lorelei and her Cloyster using Pikachu only to lose easily. Lorelei does see a lot of potential in Ash, but she advises Ash to find more of his inner strength and be more connected with his Pokémon.

Voiced by (English): Allyson Johnson (4Kids), Lisa Ortiz (TPCi, M20)Voiced by (Japanese): Kazuko Sugiyama

Agatha is the Ghost-type Gym Leader of the Elite Four. Shortly after Ash came back home from his Hoenn Journey, Ash came across her at Viridian City where it is revealed that she is the temporary substitute Gym Leader, until a replacement can be found. At the same time, Ash also met Scott who provided Ash the Battle Frontier quest and introduced Ash to her. Ash attempted to battle her to prove his strength to Scott only to lose to her. However, both Agatha and Scott recommended Ash to challenge the Battle Frontier quest which Ash accepts. Agatha wishes Ash good luck on the quest.

In Movie 20: I Choose You!, Agatha only appeared in a nightmare sequence as a teacher in a world where no Pokémon existed and Ash was attending a normal school.

Hoenn Elite Four and former Champion
The strongest trainers of the Hoenn region. As of Journeys, the three other members of the Hoenn Elite Four, Glacia, Phoebe and Sidney, have yet to appear in the anime. In addition, Wallace lost his title as Hoenn Champion to Steven Stone sometime prior to Mega Evolution Special II.

Voiced by (English): Brian Maillard (4Kids), Edward Bosco (TPCi)Voiced by (Japanese): Shōzō Iizuka

Besides being the Dragon-type user of the Hoenn Elite Four, Drake is also a sea captain as he uses his ship to travel around the world. He first appeared in the Ruby and Sapphire episode, "Vanity Affair." After watching Ash using his Torkoal to defeat a trainer's Scizor, Drake meets Ash and friends at a local restaurant. He decided to test Ash's strength by challenging him into a battle. Although Ash put up a good fight, he lost easily. Drake reveals that the reason for the loss was due to Ash acting overconfident in his strength, a similar mistake Drake made when he was young. To properly win battles and become stronger, Drake feels that trainers should concentrate on the match and remove all idle thoughts.

He returns in Journeys, helping Ash and Goh find a Kingdra for Goh's Project Mew mission as well as seeking Ash and Goh's help for finding treasure located in a sunken submarine.

Voiced by (English): Sean ReyesVoiced by (Japanese): Toshiyuki Morikawa

Wallace was the Hoenn Champion from Sootopolis City around the time Ash was competing in both the Hoenn and Sinnoh League. In addition, he was also a Top Coordinator and hosts the Wallace Cup. Anyone who wins the Wallace Cup, will not only earn the Aqua Ribbon, but the Aqua Ribbon can grant the coordinator access to any Grand Festival regardless of region. He is a friendly man and does get to hang out with people and provide advice whenever he is not working. Sometimes he can act narcissistic and gets slightly offended when Ash forgot who Wallace was despite meeting him in Sinnoh as well as acting too persistent in letting Ash battling him despite Wallace not competing in the World Coronation series. The outfit Wallace wore during the Wallace Cup was when he became Top Coordinator as well as it was designed by Lila, a friend of Dawn's mother, Johanna. In Journeys, his outfit is the same one he wore in Omega Ruby and Alpha Sapphire.

He first appeared in the Sinnoh Wallace Cup arc, where Dawn and May were competing against each other. Both female trainers/friends of Ash battled each other out with Dawn merging victorious, putting an end to her losing streak. Wallace later appeared in flashbacks and has appeared in a fantasy.

In Mega Evolution Special II, it is revealed that Steven Stone is the new Champion of Hoenn, confirming that Wallace no longer holds the title. Wallace returns in Journeys, where it is revealed that he is the current Sootopolis Gym Leader and his niece, Lisia, had made her debut scouting potential coordinators while meeting Chloe. Wallace reunites with Ash, revealing that despite not competing in the World Coronation series, he was watching all of Ash's World Coronation series matches. Wallace then battles Ash only to lose easily. Wallace gives Ash a second Rain Badge and his scarf as proof of Ash's victory, much to Ash's bafflement, as this was done to remind fans that Ash is a Champion, thus he cannot do anymore Gym Challenges.

Sinnoh Elite Four
The second strongest trainers of the Sinnoh region and the League. All Elite Four members made their debut in the Diamond and Pearl series.

Voiced by (English): David LapkinVoiced by (Japanese): Daisuke Namikawa

Lucian is the Psychic-type User of the Sinnoh Elite Four, whose tactic is to analyze and wear out the opponent's energy before striking. At the Pokémon Center, Lucian first appears in person informing the heroes of the Champion League. The Champion League reveals that once you win the region League, you get to face off against the Champions and Elite Four. He also battles Dawn's Buizel and wins while pointing out where Buizel went wrong in battle. After some improving, Lucian refights Buizel again and stops the battle, pointing out that Dawn and Buizel need more work and improve their battle style. This concept was disregarded when Dawn traded her Buizel for Ash's Aipom as Buizel was into battle while Aipom was into contests. Lucian attempted to battle Cynthia in the Champion League but lost the match to her.

Voiced by (English): Christopher C. AdamsVoiced by (Japanese): Kenshō Ono, Chinami Nishimura (young)

The Bug-type user of the Sinnoh Elite Four, Aaron is known to conduct training sessions in a town near Hearthrome City. It is revealed that his first Pokémon was a Wurmple and was his close friend. However, after losing a match, he angrily abandoned his Wurmple and ran off. Aaron regretted his decision and vowed to understand Bug-type Pokémon so that he would not repeat the same mistake again, hence why he chose to be a Bug-type user of the Elite Four. He reunited with his Wurmple which had evolved into a Beautifly while apologizing for his behavior. Like Ash, Aaron always places friendship as a high value.

He attempted to battle Cynthia in the Champion League only to lose to her.

Voiced by (English): Tom Wayland (Diamond & Pearl), Daman Mills (Journeys)Voiced by (Japanese): Toru Nara

Flint is the Fire-type user of the Sinnoh Elite Four and childhood friend of Volkner, the Sunyshore Gym Leader. Much like Volkner, Flint spent his childhood facing off against street hoodlums. He later met Volkner and became a rival to him, but they later became friends after teaming up against a Proprietor. At the age of 20, Flint moved out of Sunyshore City and became an Elite Four while Volkner became a Gym Leader.

He first encountered Ash and the crew when Ash was demanding a Gym Battle from Volkner, instead of just getting a Beacon Badge for free. Upon learning that Volkner refuses to fight, having grown tired of being undefeated, Flint decides to challenge Ash in an exhibition match and won with using his Infernape alone. This reinvigorated Volkner to accept Gym challenges again. He later helped Ash and friends stop Team Rocket from stealing the Sunyshore Tower and try to keep the power running at the Pokémon Center with Brock. 

Flint later watched Ash's victory against Volkner and congratulates Ash on his win. The next day, Flint met Jasmine, the Gym Leader of Olivine City, and defeated her Steelix in an exhibition match. Eventually, he went to battle against Cynthia for the Champion title only to lose to her. 

He returns in Journeys competing in the World Coronation series and is in the Master Class, only to lose to Leon easily. Flint was ranked 8th place in the Master Class. However, given that Raihan is currently ranked in 9th place after losing to Ash and Flint is later not seen amongst the Masters 8, it is revealed that Flint lost off camera too many times causing his rank to drop back into the Ultra Class. He and Volkner later watched Cynthia's match against Iris.

Voiced by (English): Mary O' BradyVoiced by (Japanese): Yōko Matsuoka

Bertha is the Ground-type user of the Sinnoh Elite Four. Although she was first mentioned by Lucian and later Officer Jenny in the early parts of Diamond and Pearl series, she would not make an appearance until towards the end of the series. She first appears in the show helping Ash and pals stop Team Rocket from stealing a trainer's Magby. Afterwards, Ash decides to challenge Bertha into a battle which she accepts. Despite a type-advantage, Ash's Torterra loses to her Hippowdon. Bertha advises Ash that to be a better trainer, always be observant in battle, though she commends Ash for working under pressure.

Bertha is the only member of the Sinnoh Elite Four who never got to face Cynthia on camera. She hates people using power-up armor as it is deemed cheating, as Team Rocket learned the hard way when they used it on their Carnivine and Seviper.

Unova Elite Four and former Champion
The strongest trainers of the Unova region. So far, the other three Unova Elite Four members, Marshal, Grimsley and Shauntal have yet to appear in the show. As of the Journeys series, Iris defeated Alder off screen and is crowned the new Unova Champion. For information on Iris, see the main protagonist section.

Voiced by (English): Miriam PultroVoiced by (Japanese): Miyu Matsuki

Caitlin is the Psychic-type user of the Unova Elite Four. Unlike in the games, there is no mention of her as a Frontier Brain in Sinnoh. She only appeared in the Junior World Cup Tournament where she and her Gothitelle faced off against Cynthia and her Garchomp in an exhibition match. While struggling, Cynthia was able to help Caitlin to overcome her problems in battle.

Voiced by (English): Scottie RayVoiced by (Japanese): Unshō Ishizuka

Alder was the Unova Champion when Ash was doing the Unova League quest. While laidback and reckless, he does provide advice and acts as a role model to many trainers. He seems to take some inspirations from Jiraiya from Naruto. Trip was a fan of Alder and strived to be a Champion like him.

In his debut, Ash meets Alder in person and requests a battle with him, while running into Trip. Although Ash put up a fight, the battle was called off when it was revealed that Alder was sleeping. This angered his Bouffalant which caused it to headbutt him. As a result, Alder forfeited his match. Trip stared in disappointment at his former idol and stormed off in disgust upon learning that Alder stated that becoming the strongest was not the key to battle, contradicting the advice Alder gave to Trip earlier. Shortly after, he was able to stop a rampaging Gigalith by removing the nail that was stuck on one of its feet.

Alder would not reappear until the Junior Cup where he was hosting the tournament. When Trip won the tournament, he got the right to face off against Alder only to lose against him easily, due to the fact that Trip was inexperienced in battle. Trip hoped to beat Alder someday, which Alder accepted, while learning his lesson about how strength is not everything.

In the Journeys series, it is revealed that Iris became the new Unova Champion (like in Black 2 and White 2), confirming that Alder no longer holds the title. Because of this reveal, it is implied that Trip failed on his goal of defeating Alder. Alder later cameoed in Journeys watching Iris' match against Cynthia.

Kalos Elite Four
The representatives and second strongest group of trainers of the Kalos League. 
 

Voiced by (English): Eli JamesVoiced by (Japanese): Hiroyuki Yoshino
 
Siebold is the Water-type user of the Kalos Elite Four, as well as a head chef of a luxury restaurant. He only appeared in the first Mega Evolutions Special where Alain challenged Siebold into a battle. Siebold accepted the challenge and easily defeated Alain's Mega Charizard X with his own Mega Blastoise. Siebold is the only Kalos Elite Four member in the anime that has not yet met Ash.
 

Voiced by (English): Barrett LeddyVoiced by (Japanese) Eiji Hanawa
 
Wikstrom is the Steel-type user of the Kalos Elite Four and is dressed as a knight. He made a cameo appearance in the 17th movie, Diancie and the Cocoon of Destruction, where he was battling Diantha for the Champion title. Despite his Mega Scizor having a type advantage, Wikstrom easily lost to her.
 
He would not make a proper appearance in the anime until Journeys, where he meets Ash and Goh. In his official series debut, Ash and Goh head to Wikstrom's Castle of Chivalry, which is a castle themed obstacle course and maze, as well as a training camp. To accomplish the obstacle course, both trainer and their Pokémon must wear knight's armor while facing off against Wikstrom's Pokémon, as well as working together as a team. Both Ash and Goh accomplished his obstacle course and earned their medals and Wikstrom also helped Goh evolve his Scyther into Scizor. He is then shown training alongside and introducing his fellow Elite Four member, Drasna, to Ash as well as watching Ash's matches against Drasna and Leon. Rinto later mentioned that he participated in Wikstrom's Castle of Chivalry, but whether he cleared the obstacle course or not is unknown. Wikstrom admires Ash as he sees a lot potential in him and his Galarian Farfetch'd/Sirfetch'd, always crying tears of joy whenever participants have passion.
 

Voiced by (English): Samara NaeymiVoiced by (Japanese): Akeno Watanabe
 
Malva is the Fire-type user of the Kalos Elite Four as well as a Team Flare agent and journalist. While she first appeared in the show reporting Professor Sycamore and his assistants examining the Anistar Sundial, she first appeared in person in Mega Evolutions IV. Here, she is one of the ten Mega-evolved users Alain had to face to power up his Mega Charizard X, where Alain emerged victorious.
 
She would not appear until the Lumiose Conference, where she is often seen reporting the Kalos League. When Team Flare attacked Kalos, Malva immediately turned against Team Flare and aided Ash and Alain in stopping Team Flare's plot. Once the ordeal was done, Malva vowed to chase after the remaining Team Flare agents and then turn herself in for her affiliation, though it is possible she will get a lighter sentence due to her part in sabotaging the crime syndicate.
 

Voiced by (English): Laila BerzinsVoiced by (Japanese): Fumi Hirano
 
Drasna is the Dragon-type user of the Kalos Elite Four. While a polite person outside of battle, Drasna is also a skilled battler and can Mega-evolve her Altaria. She can also be intimidating towards her opponents such as giving Ash a crushing handshake while declaring that she will take him down easily. Bonnie mentioned that Drasna once fought Clemont and merged victorious. Drasna first appears on a television show displaying her Dragon-type Pokémon as well as promoting an upcoming World Coronation series match against Ash. Seeing that she will be a tough opponent to overcome, as she is Ash's next Ultra Class opponent, Ash decides to train with his Sirfetch'd and Dracovish alongside Clemont and Bonnie, where Sirfetch'd succeeds in learning Meteor Assault and Dracovish learned Dragon Rush. Meanwhile, it is revealed that she is training with Wikstrom for her upcoming match. 
 
The next day she gets to meet Ash before battling him in the World Coronation series at the Lumiose Conference, the same place where Ash had his Kalos League matches. Although she puts up a good fight, she loses the match to Ash but congratulates him on his win. Her appearance in Journeys is to serve as an apology to fans for not having Drasna debut in the XY series, unlike the other three members of the Kalos Elite Four. Drasna is the first Elite Four member to have officially been defeated by Ash.

Alola Elite Four
These characters do appear in the show, however, they are not Elite Fours as there was no establishment of them in the series.

Voiced by (English): Barrett LeddyVoiced by (Japanese): Kōsuke Kuwano

Molayne is Sophocles' cousin and head of the Hokulani Observatory. While cautious, he tends to help his friends out in times of trouble. He first appeared in the series in person when Ash and his friends took a trip to the observatory. At the observatory, Molayne gives them a tour of the place as well as discussing the life cycle of Minior. Later, he attempted to dress up as the Masked Royal when Kukui could not show up only to embarrass himself, as well as putting him in a bad situation where he has to fight a heel wrestler. Luckily, Kukui was able to show up in time and help defeat his opponent. He also took Sophocles to the Mossdeep Space Center in Hoenn as Sophocles wanted to become an astrounaut. Molayne is the only Alola Elite Four member to not compete in the Battle Royale. While he only appears in a flashback in Journeys, Molayne was mentioned to have loaned his Ampharos to Sophocles to guide the Talonflame 2 asteroid explorer back to Earth.

Voiced by (English): Lauren KammerlingVoiced by (Japanese): Sumire Morohoshi

Acerola is the Ghost-type Trial Captain living on Ula Ula Island as well as an owner of a library. Living with Ghost-type Pokémon made Acerola being used to seeing various supernatural elements around her, as well as owning a dead Shiny Mimikyu nicknamed . In her debut, she had a run in with a giant Gengar nicknamed Greedy Rapooh, which tried to take her away, only to be stopped by Team Rocket and Nanu. Whenever Nanu acts lazy, Acerola has to persuade Nanu to compete in Grand Trials against Challengers, as it was his responsibility and duties. She later met and helped Ash, who was in need of training, to face off against Nanu for his third Grand Trial. Acerola returned later on in the show, helping Ash and co. build a haunted house, only for them to be trapped in nightmares caused by a wild Mismagius. Acerola later competed in the Alola League only to lose to Kiawe. It's also revealed that she acquired Greedy Rapooh between the League and the Ula Ula island arc.

Voiced by (English): Christina AndersonVoiced by (Japanese): Chisa Yūki

Kahili is a professional golfer and has a Toucannon, nicknamed , as her main Pokémon of choice. She had been on a losing streak lately and was losing confidence in her golfing skills. After evading a group of reporters, she meets with Ash and pals at the Pokémon School. Kahili decided to teach them how to play golf and invited them to a nearby golf course. While practicing, Kahili gets challenged by a master caddy to win a difficult hole. After successfully doing so, she got her confidence back and is later seen winning a golf tournament on television. She later competed in the Alola League only to be eliminated in the Battle Royale tournament.

Masters Eight
If a Trainer places in ninth position in the world ranking, the trainer in ninth and the highest position in the Ultra Class must defeat the Trainer in eighth and the lowest position of the Masters Eight in an entrance match to enter this elite group, Ash entered this group after beating Raihan. When all entrance battles are finished for the entire season, the final eight members are decided. Near the end of the season, the Masters Eight face off against each other in a single-elimination tournament called the Masters Eight Tournament, held at Wyndon Stadium. The winner of this tournament achieves the title of Monarch, acknowledged by many as the strongest Trainer in the world. All members of Masters Eight (except Alain) are also Pokémon Champions.

Voiced by (English): Alejandro SaabVoiced by (Japanese): Daisuke Ono

Leon is the Galar Champion as well as the former Supreme Monarch in the World Coronation series. He is a childhood friend of Sonia back when both became trainers. When Leon was a little boy, he had to take care of his family which meant Sonia was his only friend. After meeting a Charmander, Leon decided to travel together with Sonia. However, Chairman Rose took Leon under his wing, as he saw potential and caused a rift between the two childhood friends. Despite this, Leon does care about Galar, is still friends with Sonia, and would not let people use dangerous Pokémon such as Eternatus for personal gains. He also has poor sense of direction such as trying to find his way back to the Ballonlea Gym. While unstoppable, Leon does feel powerless at times if there were greater threats that he could possibly not handle or if there were challengers that may be powerful than him as he mentioned his insecurities to Ash. Many trainers, especially Ash, wanted to face off against Leon. Leon is introduced in the series where he battles against Lance and wins the match. Shortly after, a Gigantamax Drednaw was causing problems outside Wyndon Stadium. Leon aids Ash and a Gigantamax Pikachu by providing Ash a Dynamax Band and gives him an overview on how to utilize Gigantamax. He does battle other trainers such as Raihan, Lance and Flint as well as helping Ash and Goh stop the Darkest Day from happening. While Leon does use his Gigantamax Charizard in battles, he changes up the move set to throw his opponents off. He also watched Ash's World Coronation Series battle against Bea and Raihan as a special guest in the commentary box and helped Ash train in the Wild Area. Leon is also given the responsibility to tame the Eternatus Goh caught during the Darkest Day, since Goh felt Leon could do a better job. He faces off against Ash in the World Coronation Series finals, shortly after Ash defeated Cynthia. Next to Charizard and Dragapult, Leon is also revealed to own a Mr. Rime and all three fully evolved Galar starters (Rillaboom, Cinderace and Inteleon). After a lengthy battle, Leon finally loses the match to Ash, relinquishing his title of Monarch to the latter. He is later seen refereeing Hop's battle against Bea.

Voiced by (English): Emily BauerVoiced by (Japanese): Tomo Sakurai

Cynthia is the reigning Champion of the Sinnoh League. Her signature Pokémon, Garchomp is not only capable of Mega Evolution, but it was also revealed that it was hatched from an egg that Cynthia took care of when she was a little girl. Garchomp is also confirmed to be Cynthia's starter Pokémon instead of one of the three Sinnoh starters (Piplup, Turtwig, and Chimchar). Cynthia also used to solely focus on getting stronger, but she abandoned that goal upon learning about the legends of Dialga and Palkia and that she was only hurting her Pokémon more by being too reckless. Her side interests are in studying the archaeology and legends of the Sinnoh Region. She appears many times throughout the Diamond & Pearl series where helps Ash and his friends try to stop Team Galactic from reaching their ultimate goal. Successful, she later appears at the Sinnoh League tournament where she observes the battles as the league's Champion. She reappears in Best Wishes! Season 2 and reunites with Ash, as she has arranged to enter Unova's Pokémon World Tournament Junior Cup for a demonstration match against Caitlin, a member of Unova's Elite Four. For the first few episodes of the Season, Ash and his friends stay at her villa in Undella Town. In Journeys, she is seen watching Ash's battle against Volkner on a large television screen. Volkner also mentions and warns Ash that Cynthia is in the Masters Eight rankings. She later meets with Ash again in Johto to find out why a town is plunged in eternal night, while helping a girl cope with the death of her Cleffa. Cynthia later aids Ash and Chloe by providing information on Dialga and Palkia, while investigating the disappearing Pokémon across Sinnoh. Cynthia would also team up with Ash, Goh, Dawn and Brock to stop Team Galactic from opening the portal to retrieve Cyrus in the Arceus Chronicles. She is ranked second in the Masters Eight, behind Leon. Cynthia battled Iris and won using her Mega-Garchomp and entered the semi-finals facing Ash for the first time. Despite her Spiritomb defeating half of Ash's team and using a Dynamax Togekiss, Cynthia loses the match to Ash. Cynthia also planned on retiring after the Masters Eight matches, but after her loss against Ash, she decided not to as she felt there is still room for her to improve.

Voiced by (Japanese): Rintarō Nishi (season 6); Ken'ichi Suzumura (Mega Evolution Specials; seasons 18–present)Voiced by (English): Andrew Paull
A Steel-type Trainer and the Champion of the Hoenn region by season 18, Steven's appeared in person in "A Hole Lotta Trouble". Steven has had his own Aron use Roar to calm the agitated Aron horde that was terrorizing Ash, his friends, and Team Rocket in Granite Cave. He then tells the horde that the group are good people and they turn around and leave. Steven finds a Fire Stone with the help of Aron. He decides to lead Ash and his friends out of Granite Cave and took them to a deserted inlet, an ideal place for Ash to train for his rematch with Brawly at the Dewford Gym. Steven reappears in "Mega Evolution Special II", where he battles Alain using his Shiny Mega Metagross, but the battle is interrupted by Lysandre. Deciding to cooperate with Alain and company, Steven travels to an ancient ruin, discovering a mechanism where two Key Stones summon a glowing Giant Rock from underneath the ruin. After Lysandre and his research team begins analyzing the giant stone, a Rayquaza appears from the sky, Mega Evolves into Mega Rayquaza, and overwhelms Alain and Steven's Mega Evolved Pokémon. In "Mega Evolution Special III", Alain and Steven head for the ocean, where Primal Reversion Groudon and Kyogre clash with one another. In "Mega Evolution Special IV", Steven returns Mairin and Mairin's Chespin, Chespin to Kalos. Steven watches the battle between Alain and Malva. After the battle, Steven arrived to where Chespie is lying in a bed, unconscious from absorbing too much energy from an experiment. Steven meets with Sawyer in a flashback in "Rivals: Today and Tomorrow!" He reappears in "The Right Hero for the Right Job!", "Rocking Kalos Defenses!", and "Forming a More Perfect Union!", where he joins the battle against Team Flare. He eventually battled alongside Ash, Alain, Diantha, and all of the Kalos Gym Leaders to stop the Giant Rock. It is revealed in "The First Day of the Rest of Your Life!" that Steven is the one who gave Sawyer a Key Stone. Later, in "Till We Compete Again!", Steven and Sawyer study the Giant Rock. He proceeds to give Sawyer some information, which Sawyer then writes down in his notebook. He is seen as a sort of mentor figure by Sawyer, whom Steven gave a Key Stone and Sceptilite, which enables him to Mega Evolve his Sceptile. Steven also appears in Journeys in a flashback and is confirmed to be a member of the Masters 8 in the World Coronation Series, being in third position. Steven faced off against Ash only to lose.

Voiced by (English): Wayne GraysonVoiced by (Japanese): Susumu Chiba

Lance is the Dragon-type User of the Kanto Elite Four and Champion of both Kanto and Johto, as well as a member of the Pokémon G-men detective organization.  He first appeared in the Johto series, posing as a Team Rocket grunt, to infiltrate the forced evolution of a Red Gyarados near Lake Rage. With the help of Ash and friends, Lance was able to free the Red Gyarados acquiring it for his team, as well as defeat most of the Grunts and have them arrested. He returns in the Ruby and Sapphire series where he infiltrates the Team Magma base, freed Ash and pals again, as well as calming both Groudon and Kyogre.

After a long absence, Lance returns in Journeys where it is revealed that he is competing in the World Coronation series as well as being able to Dynamax. He battled Leon for the title of Monarch, only to fall short and finished as a runner-up. However, he maintained his place in the Masters 8 by the time Ash ascended to it, now placing in fourth position. He faces off against Diantha only to lose to her. Lance is the only member of the Masters Eight that has not fought Ash.

Voiced by (English): Vanessa GardnerVoiced by (Japanese): Fumiko Orikasa

Diantha is the Kalos Champion and a famous actress. In the episode, "Battling in the Hall of Fame!", it is revealed that she attended Professor Sycamore's summer camps when she was a little girl, as seen on a picture next to Ash and co.'s picture. Her main Pokémon partner is a Gardevoir that can Mega-evolve, which Diantha had ever since it was a young Ralts. Calm and collected, Diantha can command her Gardevoir without verbal communication by using her eyes.

In her debut appearance, Diantha was in an exhibition battle in Brackish Town against a trainer named Magnus and his Absol, which she won through fast evasion and knocking Absol out with Moonblast easily. Afterwards, she was taking a break from battles and meets Ash and co. while in disguise, while enjoying some delicious chocolate cake. Wanting to prove his worth to Diantha, Ash challenges her to a friendly battle which Diantha accepted. While battling, Team Rocket intervened and tried to steal Diantha's Mega Gardevoir only to fail miserably. The battle was shortly called off as her manager came to pick up Diantha. Later on, Diantha was informed by Olympia about the upcoming Team Flare disaster that was about to happen and tracks down Ash and co. who were practicing on handling Greninja's transformation. This is where Ash almost defeats Diantha only to collapse from exhaustion when trying to handle the Ash-Greninja form. Diantha later hosted the Kalos League and teamed up with Ash and pals to stop Team Flare. She makes a cameo appearance in Journeys on a magazine cover that Jessie was reading as well as being on a television advertisement that is promoting Ash's battle against Drasna. Diantha is also revealed to be a member of the Masters Eight in the World Coronation series, in fifth position. Diantha faced off against Lance and was able to win. She faced off against Leon in the semi-finals only to lose the match easily.

Diantha always remains calm in battle unless someone can put up a huge fight against her. She also has a sweet tooth as she enjoys sampling desserts when visiting new towns. Like many Champions, Elite Fours and Gym Leaders, Diantha does see a lot of potential in Ash.

Battle facility leaders

Frontier Brains

Kanto Frontier Brains
After Ash came back home from his Hoenn Journey, he meets Scott, the head of the Kanto Battle Frontier, who provides Ash the Battle Frontier Quest. There are a total of seven Frontier Brains, heads of their battle facilities across the Kanto region. The first six listed below are available to the challenger as they progress through the quest and earn a Frontier Symbol after winning, but the seventh Frontier area is not available until they defeat the first six Battle Frontiers. The Battle Frontier is heavily based on the ones the player faces in Hoenn in Pokémon Emerald. Unlike in the games, Ash only earns the Gold Symbols. In Journeys, Ash's Frontier plaque makes a cameo appearance and the Hoenn Battle Frontier area appears when Ash went to win the Battle Frontier Flute Cup Tournament.

Voiced by: Nobuyuki Hiyama (Japanese), David Wills (English)

Factory Head Noland is the owner of the Battle Factory. His battle is for the challenger to choose their own opponent they want Noland to use for the fight. He is also an inventor as he flies around on his airplane he built.

In his debut appearance, Ash and the gang encounter him after one of his inventions goes out of control. He owns multiple Pokémon to randomize the battle types. He is also revealed to have befriended an Articuno, having mended its broken wing, but never caught it. After some consideration, Ash decided to face off against Articuno.

Knowing that Articuno was going to be a difficult opponent, Ash summoned his Charizard from Charicific Valley to fight this Legendary Pokémon. Noland and Ash battled and after a long fight, Ash wins his first Frontier symbol. Noland also gave Ash a Frontier Pass called a "Frontier folio" to hold his symbols.

Voiced by: Sanae Kobayashi (Japanese), Sonny Dey (English)

Arena Tycoon Greta is the owner of the Battle Arena, which is a large karate dojo. She also is an instructor there and has multiple students training under her. She uses Fighting-type Pokémon for her battles in the anime. It is revealed that her two role models were Chuck and Brawly, the two Fighting-type Gym Leaders.

Before the battle commences, the challenger has to spin a wheel to determine how many Pokémon both trainer and Frontier Brain get to use. As Ash landed on two, this meant it is a two on two battle. There are a couple of wedges which allowed both sides to use three Pokémon. However, as Ash only landed on the two wedge, nobody knows what Greta's third Pokémon is. Although Greta's Hariyama took out Ash's Grovyle, Ash used his Snorlax to take out her Hariyama and Medicham, despite a type disadvantage.

Speed-based strategies are a terrible choice of tactic against Greta's team as she can use speed and physical moves to stop her opponents. However, attacks from behind or above her Pokémon are her weaknesses and they can also suffer damage if their moves missed.

Voiced by: Kenta Miyake (Japanese), Bill Rogers (English)

Dome Ace Tucker is the head of the Battle Dome and a famous actor. He loves to put on spectacular performances and has a large crowd watching his battles. His debut episode is where, for once, most of Ash's achievements are finally acknowledged. A challenger always has a press conference before the battle commences.

His battle functions as a Double Battle where he uses Arcanine and Swampert against Ash's Swellow and Corphish. Tucker is shown to be a deadly battler where he uses a variety of move combinations, forcing Ash to create new attack combos. After a lengthy fight, Ash wins his third Frontier Symbol.

Voiced by: Atsuko Tanaka (Japanese), Emlyn Morinelli McFarland (English)

Pike Queen Lucy is the head of the Battle Pike. Unlike in the games where she is cold and distant, she is quite a nice friendly woman, although she gets irritated if her assistants were rude to her guests. She is one of the few female characters to have romantic feelings for Brock.

In her debut appearance, when her assistant, Barbara, was furious when Ash went to the Pike without greeting her and fellow associates (he was lured into a Team Rocket trap), Lucy comes in and tells Barbara off for her rude attitude. Lucy later helped Ash rescue Pikachu from Team Rocket and sent them flying using her own Seviper, which is way stronger than Jessie's. At first, the Pike was closed which meant Ash could not battle, but Lucy decides to accept the Frontier challenge (possibly because of her romantic feelings towards Brock). While she put up a good fight against Ash, she loses. Nevertheless, she does compliment on Ash for having good friends and having a great battle. 

Her tactic is all about offense and head on attacks but she never uses defense tactics as she never taught her Pokémon that tactic. This was what led to her loss against Ash. She loves serpentine Pokémon, using them for battle, and those with squinty eyes she kept at home, just like Brock. 

Voiced by: Nachi Nozawa (Japanese), Eric Schussler (English)

Palace Maven Spenser is the head of the Battle Palace, a large temple in Metallica Island. Despite his old age, he is athletic which enables him to run around in the jungle. The entire island serves as a battlefield where both opponents need to maintain their pace and use the environments to their advantage. He also provides a snack break in the middle of the battle if everyone is getting exhausted.

In his debut, he helped cured Ash's Pikachu with a natural remedy and later stopped Team Rocket from stealing Ash's Pikachu and Sceptile. The next day, both Spenser and Ash battled each other using the environments and weather conditions to their advantage. Ash was able to win with his Sceptile.

Voiced by: Akiko Kimura (Japanese), Hilary Thomas (English)

Salon Maiden Anabel is the head of the Battle Tower. Unlike in the games, she is the sixth Frontier Brain instead of the seventh (she switched positions with Brandon). She also uses Psychic-Type Pokémon in battles. She does not appear in the Sun and Moon anime which resulted in her role as an International Police Officer, like in the games, being completely omitted. Ever since she was a child, she had an empathetic ability which allowed her to communicate and understand a Pokémon's feelings.

In her debut, Anabel comes across Ash, who was training for his match. After calming a wild Gyarados and some Beedrill, Anabel also stopped Team Rocket from stealing their Pokémon. While drying off at her place, everyone found out that Anabel was a girl. When Ash and friends arrived at the Battle Tower Salon, it turns out that Anabel was also a Frontier Brain. She defeats Ash easily in the match, putting an end to Ash's Frontier Brain winning streak.

Later on, after training for a rematch, with a bit of help from Anabel, Ash merges victorious. With his six Frontier symbols, the Battle Pyramid is now available for Ash to fight. Unbeknownst to Ash, Anabel was revealed to have romantic feelings for him.

She can telepathically give command by using only her mind. However, dark rooms are troublesome as she cannot see where her opponents are.

Voiced by: Masayuki Omoro (Japanese), Craig Blair (English)

Pyramid King Brandon is the head of the Battle Pyramid. In the games, he is the sixth Frontier Brain with Anabel as the final. In the anime, he is the seventh and final Frontier Brain who will not be able to challenge the trainers, until they defeated the first six Frontier Brains. His Pyramid flies around, which is why the location changes frequently and is initially unavailable. He works as an archaeologist, exploring various ruins and learning about their history.

In his debut, the heroes encountered him while exploring a ruin. When Ash gets possessed by the evil spirit of King of Pokélantis, Brandon was forced to battle him using Regirock against Ash's Sceptile to free Ash. Afterwards, Brandon harshly explains that Ash was possessed due to his immaturity. Later on, Ash does battle Brandon, who acquire a Registeel during his ruin exploration. While Ash did lose the battle, Brandon knew Ash was on the right track and advised Ash to fight as one with his Pokémon before returning for a rematch. Taking Brandon's advice to heart, Ash calls in Squirtle, Charizard and Bulbasaur, for training and camping out for the final showdown. This time in the final battle, Brandon goes easy on Ash, using only Regice along with Solrock, Dusclops and Ninjask. After a hard fight, Ash finally wins the Battle Frontier Quest. Although accepted into the Hall of Fame, Ash turned down the position of Frontier Brain as he needs to explore more regions and develop his own skills. Brandon bids Ash farewell, hoping to see each other again.

After a couple flashback appearances, Brandon returns in Diamond and Pearl. Shortly after Ash won his gym battle against Candice, Paul arrived to battle her as well. Although his gym battle was scheduled for a later day, Paul encounters the Battle Pyramid which arrived in Snowpoint City as Brandon was going to explore the ruins there. Paul shows up and challenges Brandon into a full battle with both sides switching Pokémon. It is revealed in the past, Paul's older brother, Reggie, did try to battle Brandon while Paul watched when he began his own journey. Despite Reggie's efforts, he lost easily to Brandon due to having a lacklustre strategy. As Reggie gets questioned with what his inner strength was, Paul wondered what his inner strength was as well and became a power-hungry jerk as a result. It was also due to the failure in winning at the Battle Pyramid was what caused Reggie to quit his career as a trainer and become a breeder. Paul's reason for battling Brandon was to avenge Reggie's loss while Paul believed that his true inner strength was his will. Brandon disagrees with this statement while questioning Paul's motives as a trainer. Despite his team having a type-advantage, Paul lost easily due to letting his anger get the better of him. Brandon harshly berates Paul for his attitude and tells him to fix it before coming back for a rematch. Shortly after, Brandon helps Ash and pals stop Pokémon Hunter J from stealing Regigigas from a temple. Although successful, Brandon stays behind to rebuild the temple and protect Regigigas. He is last mentioned when Paul reveals he is heading back to Snowpoint City for a rematch, while finally making peace with Ash. Whether Paul succeeded in defeating Brandon or not is unknown.

Brandon does not approve of foolishness such as calling out Ash for his arrogance, when the King of Pokélantis possessed Ash. Brandon believes that inner strength can be achieved through strong bonds between Trainer and Pokémon. He does not believe in brute force strategies as this was one of the reasons why Reggie and Paul lost to him.

Sinnoh Frontier Brains
In Diamond and Pearl, there was a Sinnoh Battle Frontier that was established and serves as a reference to Pokémon Platinum. However, Ash has not challenged the Sinnoh Frontier, as chances to do so was disregarded in favor of the Sinnoh League arc. This meant that Dahlia, Argenta, Thorton, and Darach have yet to appear in the show. Caitlin, who is the co-owner of the Battle Castle, appears as a Unova Elite Four member without any mention of her past as a Frontier Brain.

Voiced by (English): Carmen BorgiaVoiced by (Japanese): Nobuyuki Hiyama

Tower Tycoon Palmer is the head of the Battle Tower. He's also revealed to Barry's father. He made a cameo appearance in Arceus and the Jewel of Life where his Milotic lost to Cynthia's Garchomp. He only appeared in the Twinleaf Festival Arc, where he helps Barry to look into the past and its connection to the future.

He later hosted the Twinleaf battle Tournament, which not only meant that the Trainer will win the competition, they will also get to battle Palmer. Although Ash won the tournament and was acknowledged as the winner of the tournament, he lost to Palmer. Afterwards, Palmer suggests to Ash to challenge the final Gym Leader, Volkner, at Sunyshore City.

Unova Subway Bosses

Voiced by (English): Marc DiraisonVoiced by (Japanese): Kensuke Satō

Voiced by (English): Wayne GraysonVoiced by (Japanese): Kiyotaka Furushima

Ingo and Emmet are brothers and train conductors. While twins, Ingo is confirmed to be the older twin. Cilan was revealed to be acquainted with them, having first met them at a rail enthusiast convention. In battles, Ingo always takes the lead allowing for an opening for Emmet to attack.

Within their debut appearance, they started to notice that the track switches were being tampered and later investigated the problem. Unbeknownst to them at the time, Team Rocket was revealed to be responsible for their actions. It is later revealed that Team Rocket were planning on stealing all the Pokémon from the Pokémon Center. The Unova Subway Bosses teamed up with Ash and co. and successfully retrieved all the stolen Pokémon forcing Team Rocket to retreat. Later, after Ash won his Gym Battle against Elesa, Ingo and Emmet helped a girl locate her lost Axew while doing a stamp rally. While Ash and pals were successful in returning the female Axew to her owner, Ingo and Emmet challenge Ash and Cilan to battle and defeated them easily. Both appear in fantasies afterwards and as well as appearing in an illusion in the Journeys series.

Professors

Voiced by (Japanese): Unshō Ishizuka (until SM043); Kenyu Horiuchi (since SM093); Keiko Toda (child)
Voiced by (English): Jimmy Zoppi (English; PUSA/DuArt), Stan Hart (English; 4Kids), Tara Sands (young; Pokémon 4ever)
Professor Oak is a Pokémon researcher and the grandfather of Gary Oak. He was once a competitive Trainer, and is generally considered the best in his field. As such, his role in the Pokémon games and anime is that of a mentor to young Pokémon Trainers, a source of information and an occasional plot device. Amongst other things, he is credited with inventing the Pokédex. He also hands out a Bulbasaur, Charmander or Squirtle  to beginning trainers (depending on which Pokémon the trainer chooses) to start their adventure in the Kanto Region. Although he is an expert on all matters relating to Pokémon, Professor Oak specializes in Pokémon behavioural science. In the Pokémon 4Ever, Ash meets a boy called Samuel who has been brought to the future by the time-travelling Celebi. At the end of the movie, Sam returns to his time, with Ash upset to leave his new close friend. It is then revealed that the boy, Ash, Misty, and Brock befriended grew up to be Professor Oak, meaning that Professor Oak was best friends with Ash when he was a boy. He also creates poems centered around Pokémon and is known as the rhyming professor by Dawn. He later watched Ash's battle against Steven Cynthia and Leon.

Voiced by (Japanese): Keiko Han
Voiced by (English): Kayzie Rogers
Professor Ivy is the resident Pokémon professor of the Orange Islands, south of the region of Kanto. Professor Ivy is first introduced in the second season of the Pokémon anime. Ash and his friends, Misty and Brock make their way to Valencia Island and meet the Professor. The unusual Pokéball that Professor Ivy discovered is dubbed the GS Ball. It serves as a plot device that leads Ash to the region of Johto. During the second season, Brock decides to stay with Ivy to study Pokémon breeding, but later returns to Ash's group. Misty implies that Brock left Ivy because he has been "dumped". She also appears in the animated film Pokémon: The Movie 2000. Her English name is a reference to the ivy.

Voiced by (Japanese): Kazuhiko Inoue
Voiced by (English): Paul Liberti
Professor Elm is in charge of giving novice trainers their first Pokémon (Chikorita, Cyndaquil, or Totodile) in the video games Pokémon Gold, Silver, and Crystal. He was a student of Professor Oak and moved to New Bark Town in the region of Johto where he conducts his research on Pokémon breeding. His English name refers to the elm tree, while his Japanese name refers to Deutzia. Professor Elm dresses quite casually, with a shirt that has a stripe across it slightly covered by his lab coat. He wears khaki slacks and sometimes wears night slippers or moccasins.
He is stereotypically depicted as a professor that has a tendency to be absent-minded, due to his immersion in his work. His forgetfulness was shown in an episode of the Pokémon anime where Team Rocket visit his laboratory, and the professor carelessly assumes them to be Nurse Joy from the Pokémon Center without looking up, and tells them to take the Pokémon, which they do. When the real Joy arrives, Elm discovers that one of his Pokémon, Totodile, has been stolen. With the help of Officer Jenny and the local Police Department, the Pokémon is recovered from Team Rocket. Professor Elm has also been described as the top student of Professor Oak, and seems to have a desire to surpass Professor Oak's accomplishments. He has a Corsola.

Voiced by (Japanese): Fumihiko Tachiki
Voiced by (English): Dan Green
Professor Birch is considered the "Pokémon Professor" in the Hoenn region. Unlike other Pokémon scientists, he is known for his field work, rather than, in his own words, remaining "cooped up in his lab all day." He is an expert in the field of Pokémon habitual distribution. He is also responsible for giving new Pokémon Trainers one of the three Hoenn starter Pokémon: Treecko, Torchic, or Mudkip. These Pokémon are found in Pokémon games Ruby, Sapphire, and Emerald. His English name refers to the birch tree, while his Japanese name refers to the Columbine flower.
In the anime, Professor Birch appears at the start of the Hoenn Saga. When Ash arrives in the Hoenn region, his Pikachu is ill from an overexposure to magnetism, and needs treatment immediately. Birch himself takes Ash and Pikachu back to his lab. Birch gives May her first Pokémon, a Torchic, a Pokédex, and some Poké Balls. He later appears when Ash, May, Brock, and Max return to Littleroot to help save the Starter Pokémon from Team Rocket, and also helps to solve the mystery of Clamperl's evolutions. He also cameoed in Journeys watching Steven's match against Ash.

Voiced by: Iemasa Kayumi (Japanese, Diamond and Pearl), Eizo Tsuda (Japanese, Journeys onwards), Sean Reyes (English)
Professor Rowan is the authority on Pokémon in the region of Sinnoh, the setting of the Pokémon video games Pokémon Diamond and Pearl and Pokémon Platinum. Professor Rowan's name derives from the rowan tree, continuing the trend of the names of Pokémon professors deriving from the names of trees, while his Japanese name refers to Sorbus commixta, the Japanese Rowan tree.
Rowan's laboratory is located in Sandgem Town, making him the first professor in the Pokémon series not to live in the protagonist's town. He specializes in the research of Pokémon evolution and is considered a senior researcher to Professor Oak, whom he is old friends with. He gives the player a Pokédex, and allows him or her and the rival to keep one of the three Sinnoh Starter Pokémon (Turtwig, Chimchar and Piplup) each after they are attacked by Starly while searching for a rare Pokémon, having seen a red Gyarados on TV appearing at Lake Verity.
Professor Rowan appears in the first episode of Pokémon: Diamond and Pearl, "Following a Maiden's Voyage!", he meets Dawn and later gives her Piplup. He runs a Pokémon Summer Academy; he is shown to be serious in nature as is exhibited by his breaking up Ash and Angie's constant fights and surprising them when they are late arriving to the Summer Academy. While the real Professor Rowan does not appear in Journeys, Professor Rowan's alternate counterpart appears in the Dialga and Palkia two parter. 

Voiced by (Japanese): Naomi Shindō
Voiced by (English): Khristine Hvam
Professor Juniper is the authority on Pokémon in the region of Unova, the setting of the Pokémon video games, Pokémon Black and White. Professor Juniper's name derives from the juniper tree, continuing the trend of the names of Pokémon professors deriving from the names of trees, while her Japanese name derives from a name for the Japanese Yew.
Juniper's laboratory is located in Nuvema Town. In the anime, she is a friend of Professor Oak. As a present, she gives the player and the player's rivals Cheren and Bianca, the Starter Pokémon of Unova: Snivy, Tepig and Oshawott.
Professor Juniper appears in the first episode of Pokémon: Black & White titled "In The Shadow of Zekrom!". She meets Trip and later gives him Snivy and when her Oshawott runs away and follows Ash, she allows Ash to keep the Pokémon.

Voiced by (Japanese): Hiroshi Tsuchida
Voiced by (English): Jake Paque
Professor Augustine Sycamore is the authority on Pokémon in the region of Kalos, the setting of the Pokémon video games, Pokémon X and Y. Professor Sycamore's name derives from the sycamore tree, continuing the trend of the names of Pokémon professors deriving from the names of trees, while his Japanese name derives from the French word for Plane Tree.
Sycamore's laboratory is located in Lumiose City. He is the first Professor in the video games who the player is able to battle. To start the player on their journey he will give them a choice of Starter Pokémon of Kalos: Chespin, Fennekin, Froakie. He is also shown to have a connection with Alain as well as hosting the Kalos Summer Camp programs. Professor Sycamore also makes a cameo in Journeys watching Alain's match against Leon alongside Mairin as well as comforting Mairin when Alain lost. He later watched Ash's battle against Leon alongside Mairin and Alain.

Voiced by (English): Abe Goldfarb
Voiced by (Japanese): Keiichi Nakagawa
Professor Kukui appears in the Alola region, where Pokémon Sun and Moon take place. His name comes from the candlenut tree (often referred to as kukui), a plant traditionally indigenous to Hawaii.
Kukui is married to Professor Burnet, who studies the relationship between Pokémon and other dimensions. She works at the Dimensional Research Lab in Heahea City, which the player is invited to from Kukui in Pokémon Sun and Moon. This is the first time a professor in the Pokémon series has been revealed to have a romantic relationship with a named character.
Kukui's laboratory is located on Route 1, the first time a professor's laboratory is not within a town or city. He also teaches students at a school that Ash currently attends with Lana, Mallow, Lillie, Sophocles and Kiawe. Kukui gives Ash a Rotom as the operating Pokédex. In the games, he offers the player Rowlet, Litten or Popplio. Kukui also frequents the Battle Royal Dome under the alias "the Masked Royal". At the end of Pokémon Sun and Moon, the player can battle him as the Champion of the Alolan Elite Four. The exhibition match between himself and Ash is a reference to the final battle of Sun and Moon, where the player must defeat him to fully keep their title of Champion. He made a guest appearance Ash returns to Alola in the 37th episode of Pokémon Journeys, it is revealed that he has a son named Lei. He also appeared in a flashback of the 96th episode of Pokémon Journeys. He later competes in the Battle Royale match as himself instead of his Masked Royal persona because Kukui stated that Ash is the star of the match instead. He later watched Ash's battle against Leon.

Voiced by (English): Melissa Hope
Voiced by (Japanese): Sachi Kokuryū
Professor Burnet is a researcher who specializes in the relationship between Pokémon and other dimensions; for her research, she won the Alola Woman of the Year award.  She is first seen investigating the Altar of the Sunne alongside Lusamine, Wicke, and Faba, due to Ultra Aura being detected from that location.  The team returns empty-handed to Aether Paradise, but heads to Melemele Island when another Ultra Aura is detected (the source being Nebby), and Burnet is introduced to Ash at Professor Kukui's house.  Burnet tells him about the legend of the Ultra Beasts and the possibility of Nebby being one.  Burnet and Kukui marry during the series and she moves into Professor Kukui's house, where she lives with Ash and Kukui while continuing her research at Aether Paradise.  During the ending of the Pokémon Sun and Moon anime's final episode, it is revealed that she is pregnant, the first time in the history of the series that a female character is showing physical signs of pregnancy. When Ash returns to Alola in the 37th episode of Pokémon Journeys, it is revealed that she gave birth to a son named Lei. Burnet has also made another guest appearance for Lillie's homecoming party and Ash's Battle Royale match as well as watching the final match between Ash and Leon.

Voiced by (English): Jeremy Levy
Voiced by (Japanese): Jirō Saitō
Mohn is a younger man, Mohn moved to the Alola region to continue researching Ultra Wormholes. He was also a powerful Trainer, who defeated Hala and earned himself a Z-Ring. Mohn alongside his wife, Lusamine, were confirmed to have created the Aether Foundation. One day, Mohn was sucked into an Ultra Wormhole and disappeared many years prior to the Sun and Moon series. Everyone thought that he was dead until it is revealed in Ultimate Journeys that he ended up inside of Nihilego's homeworld. A Shiny Nihilego saved him and teleported him to the Crown Tundra. He suffered from amnesia from this encounter but was able to recover and regained his memories. He reunited with Lusamine, Gladion and Lillie while also meeting Ash, Goh and Chloe for the first time. Following the reunion, the family alongside Ash and friends head back to Alola.

Voiced by (English): Ray ChaseVoiced by (Japanese): Yūichi Nakamura
 Professor Cerise is a calm, but friendly person, and he is a professor in Pokémon Journeys: The Series. He is knowledgeable about Pokémon, being deemed a genius since he was young. He is also exceptionally enthusiastic when it comes to studying Pokémon. Sometimes, he gets so carried away that it embarrasses his daughter, prompting her to reign him in.

Voiced by (English): Mary O'Brady
Voiced by (Japanese): Shoko Tsuda
Professor Magnolia is a friendly and gentle old lady who is the former Pokémon Professor of the Galar region. She studies the Dynamax phenomenon and its origins. After Chairman Rose nearly destroys the Galar region by summoning Eternatus, she promptly seals it away deep underground, and makes her granddaughter Sonia the new Pokémon Professor of Galar. Professor Magnolia and Sonia are also helping Leon to tame Eternatus so that it could be comfortable in interacting with people. Out of all the region professors, Professor Magnolia took the longest time to meet Ash in person.

Voiced by (English): Brittany Cox
Voiced by (Japanese): Marina Inoue
A young woman who is Professor Magnolia's apprentice and successor. She is Leon's childhood friend and former rival who got him inspired to become the undefeated champion. Both of them used to travel together until a rift between the two occurred when Chariman Rose took Leon under his wing but Leon and Sonia are still friends. Throughout the series, Sonia aided Ash and Goh throughout the Darkest Day arc, preventing the Gigantamax and Dynamax Pokémon from running rampant throughout the region as well as taking care of Eternatus that also was causing the Darkest Day. After the ordeal was done, Sonia was promoted by her grandmother into a Pokémon Professor. Later on, she met Goh and got to discuss Leon's background, while Ash was training with Leon. Later, Sonia shows up to watch Leon's match against Ash in person. Leon mentioned that Sonia was the only other trainer to have beaten him in battle, besides Ash.

Voiced by (English): J. Michael Tatum
Voiced by (Japanese): Yoichi Nishijima
Professor Amaranth is the head of the Project Mew missions. He always wanted to research Mew, but to do so, he requires several Chasers for the job. To become a Chaser, trainers must complete certain Project Mew Trial missions which include catching a certain Pokémon, finding items that belong to a Pokémon (e.g., Moltres feather) and competing in a Battle Royale. Each accomplished missions grant the trainer a certain number of Project Mew tokens. Once trainers earn a large number of tokens at the end of the season, then they qualify as Chasers. However, if an applicant only earned less than four tokens, then they are disqualified. Amaranth also has low tolerance for poachers such as letting Chasers confiscate all the poacher's Pokémon used for illegal activities and sending them back into the wild.

Voiced by (English): TBA
Voiced by (Japanese): Taku Yashiro
Friede is a Pokémon Professor that is set to appear in the Generation IX Pokémon anime. He owns a large airship and is head of an adventure crew called the Rising Volteccers.

Antagonists

Team Rocket
 is the criminal organization in the Kanto, Johto and Sevii Islands regions. Their goal is to catch all the Pokémons including Legendary Pokémon in the world so that their leader, Giovanni, can make an army of Pokémon and rule over the world. The most frequently appearing members of this organisation are the "Team Rocket trio" of Jessie, James and Meowth. They have been described "as vital to the anime as Ash himself."

Voiced by (English): Ed Paul (4Kids/TPCI); Craig Blair (Season 10; TPCI)Voiced by (Japanese): Hirotaka Suzuoki (Seasons 1–8); Kenta Miyake (Season 10+)
Giovanni is the crime lord and leader of Team Rocket—having inherited his position from his mother—and the former Viridian City Gym Leader. He is constantly frustrated by Ash's continuous interference along with his friends in his plans which they destroyed everything. Aside from the operations of Team Rocket, he also funded the creation of Mewtwo in Mewtwo Strikes Back. Mewtwo eventually escapes from him and he attempted to recapture the Pokémon in Mewtwo Returns—resulting in Mewtwo erasing all memories of himself from Giovanni's mind.  He has a secretary named Matori, who runs an elite Team Rocket group: the Matori Matrix.

Voiced by (English): Rachael Lillis (4Kids); Michele Knotz (TPCI)Voiced by (Japanese): Megumi Hayashibara
Jessie is a member of Team Rocket, more specifically part of a trio with James and Meowth, that follows Ash and his friends, usually trying to steal Ash's Pikachu. Jessie owns a Wobbuffet, who is the source of a running gag where he pops out of his Poké Ball at the strangest times.

Voiced by (English): Ted Lewis (up to and including episode 8; 4Kids); Eric Stuart (4Kids); Jimmy Zoppi (TPCI)Voiced by (Japanese): Shin-ichiro Miki
James is a member of Team Rocket, more specifically part of a trio with James and Meowth, that follows Ash and his friends, usually trying to steal Ash's Pikachu. Before joining Team Rocket, James was part of a noble, rich family, but it was a life he desperately wanted to escape from.

Voiced by (English): Matthew Sussman (up to and including episode 31; 4Kids); Maddie Blaustein (starting at episode 18, then episode 32 to episode 419; 4Kids); Jimmy Zoppi (TPCI)Voiced by (Japanese): Inuko Inuyama
Meowth fits in perfectly with his human comrades of Team Rocket as he is conniving, prideful, greedy and mischievous. His ability to speak like a normal human only makes him equally outspoken. He sometimes views himself as the boss and the leader of the trio, reason being, he builds all the contraptions and thinks of all the plans, though he is rarely taken seriously. For all his faults however, he is loyal to Jessie and James and never lets a few fights get in his way of being friends with them. He thinks highly of their boss Giovanni, and dwells on becoming his "top cat". As often as he likes to consider himself a dastardly villain, he is also often shown to be rather jaded and even philosophical at times. He often looks at the moon and laments his directions in life. Among the trio, Meowth tends to be the one who stands most on the facts rather than belief. Meowth frequently shows himself to be a rather amorous cat. For example, in Kanto, before he met Jessie and James, he fell in love with a female Meowth named Meowzie. His pursuits for Meowzie in particular chained off his ambitions to learn to speak and act human-like and ultimately his employment within Team Rocket. Meowth sparsely battles, he explains learning to walk and talk came at the expense of his battle abilities. As such, most instances he is forced to fight prove pitiful. On rare occasions however, when passionate or incensed enough, Meowth can be formidable in battle. He has also proven quite able as a performer as well, helping Jessie win several contests and showcases. More commonly, Meowth acts as a translator for Team Rocket and sometimes Ash and his friends, translating what other Pokémon are saying.  In the Darkest Day crisis, it is revealed that he can Gigantamax, and he can also use his signature G-Max Move G-Max Gold Rush.

Voiced by (English): Kayzie Rogers (EP146-XY140)Erica Schroeder (Current)Voiced by (Japanese): Yūji Ueda
 Wobbuffet is used occasionally for battles. He used to be owned by a trainer named Benny only to join Team Rocket after Jessie accidentally traded her Lickitung away, causing her Lickitung to reform under Benny's care while Wobbuffet becomes Jessie's new Pokémon partner. Wobbuffet's knowledge of moves like Counter and Mirror Coat comes in handy, since Team Rocket often find themselves on the receiving end of powerful attacks. Wobbuffet usually serves as a comic relief character due to his goofy, energetic, and looney character. He emerges from his Poké Ball frequently as a running gag, and often at inappropriate times which frustrated Jessie at times. Team Rocket has also had various vehicles and robots based on him.

Voiced by (English): Eric Stuart (4Kids), Carter Cathcart (Current)Voiced by (Japanese): Takehito Koyasu
Partner of Cassidy and rival of James, more successful than him at first. He is looked upon favorably by Giovanni. The only problem with him is that nobody can get his name right at times, like calling him Biff, Bob, Bill, Buffy, Hutch, Futch etc. (Kosanji in the Japanese version), which infuriates him. Both Butch and Cassidy return later on in the Journeys anime in response to fans being aware that the duo were replaced by Matori at the end of the Diamond and Pearl series. It turns out that he and Cassidy had officially left Team Rocket following the events of the Diamond and Pearl episode, "Sleight of Sand!", and went their separate ways. Butch has reformed and is now currently running a small bakery at a coastal village.

Voiced by (Japanese): Masako KatsukiVoiced by (English): Megan Hollingshead (Original series, 4Kids), Andi Whaley (Ruby and Sapphire, 4Kids), Emily Williams (Current)
Partner of Butch and rival of Jessie, more successful than her at first. She is looked upon favorably by Giovanni. She and Butch return in Journeys in response to fans knowing the fact the duo were replaced by Matori at the end of the Diamond and Pearl series. It turns out that Cassidy and Butch had left Team Rocket sometime after the Diamond and Pearl episode, "Sleight of Sand!" and parted ways. Cassidy has reformed and now currently works as an owner of a café in a snowy village and taken up wood carving as a hobby. 

Voiced by: Ichiro Nagai (Japanese), James Carter Cathcart (English)
A scientist who works for Team Rocket. A running gag with Dr. Namba was that others kept pronouncing his name incorrectly, which he greatly disliked, resulting in him calling the offender (despite that he couldn't possibly have heard them) and yelling that his name is Namba. Like Butch he dislikes people getting his name wrong.

Voiced by: Hidetoshi Nakamura (Japanese), Eric Stuart (English)
A scientist and the leader of Team Rocket's Johto operations, personally overseeing both Tyson and the duo of Atilla and Hun.

Voiced by: Masayuki Omoro (Japanese), Marc Thompson (English)
Dr. Zager is a Team Rocket scientist assigned to help with Jessie and James throughout the Black and White series. He takes his job as a scientist seriously but that does not stop him from getting excited at times of coming across a great discovery. Dr. Zager is known when to abort missions if plans go wrong and cannot be salvaged. Following the Operation Tempest arc, Dr. Zager retreated back to the Team Rocket Headquarters in Kanto. He is not seen since, despite Jessie, James and Meowth returning back to Unova.

Voiced by (Japanese): Kiyomi AsaiVoiced by (English): Emily Jenness
Matori is Giovanni's secretary and the leader of Matori Matrix. She first appeared in the last Diamond and Pearl episode where she orders the Team Rocket trio to head back to their headquarters for a new mission, which would lead to the events of the Black and White series. Throughout the Black and White series, Matori kept in touch with the Team Rocket group such as telling them to catch Unova Pokémon as to avoid attracting unwanted attention but stays in the headquarters by Giovanni's side. Her role would eventually be expanded in the Sun and Moon series where she actively monitors the group making sure they acquired new Alolan Pokémon and a Z-ring. She even visited Alola a few times such as leading her gang to abduct Necrozma only to retreat and trying to steal a Stufful only for Bewear to attack Matori making her develop a phobia of Bewear. Eventually, after growing sick and tired of Team Rocket's lack of results, she orders them to return to their headquarters. In Journeys, she would play an active role alongside her Matori Matrix such as stealing all the Pokémon in the Sinnoh resort while tricking the Rocket gang into taking a vacation as to get them out of their way, only to fail when Team Rocket teamed up with Ash and Goh into sabotaging her schemes and having Matori get harshly berated by Giovanni off camera for botching the mission. The Matori Matrix would later try to abduct Darkrai and Cresselia only to be trapped in their own nightmares.

Voiced by (English): Megan HollingsheadVoiced by (Japanese): Uno Kanda
Partner and older sister of Oakley and the secondary antagonist of "Pokémon Heroes". In the dub, they are confirmed to be working for Team Rocket, but in the original Japanese version, they are freelance criminals.

Voiced by: Yumiko Shaku (Japanese), Lisa Ortiz (English)
Partner and younger sister of Annie and the main antagonist of "Pokémon Heroes". In the dub, they are confirmed to be working for Team Rocket, but in the original Japanese version, they are freelance criminals.

Voiced by: Nobuyuki Hiyama (Japanese), Marc Thompson (English)
Partner of Hun and one of the main antagonists of "The Legend of Thunder!". He acts as the muscle in his partnership.

Voiced by: Toshiyuki Morikawa (Japanese), Veronica Taylor (English)
Partner of Attila and one of the main antagonists of "The Legend of Thunder!". He acts as the brains in his partnership.

Team Aqua and Team Magma
 are the two criminal organizations in the Hoenn Region.

Team Aqua
 are the rivals of Team Magma. They specialize in Water and Dark type Pokémon. Their goal is to catch and control the Legendary Pokémon Kyogre so that their leader, Archie, can raise the level of all the world's oceans.

Voiced by: Masaki Aizawa (Japanese), Sean Schemmel (English)
Archie is the leader of Team Aqua. His goal is to wipe out the land to create more sea by using Kyogre. He is more misguided than truly evil, as he believes that his actions will benefit others. He becomes possessed by the power of the Red Orb, much like Pikachu and the Blue Orb. His only concern from that point is to raise the sea, even if it meant drowning all of his Team Aqua members.

Voice by: Shōko Tsuda (Japanese), Erica Schroeder (English)
A member of Team Aqua, Shelly first appeared in "A Three Team Scheme!", where she leads a group of Aqua grunts on a mission to intercept Team Magma, who are exploring some ancient ruins on Dewford Island in search of the Cave of Origin. Owing to a dubbing error, she is mistakenly referred to as "Tactical Commander Isabel" during this episode, though her name is corrected in all subsequent appearances. In "Fight for the Meteorite!", Shelly leads a squad of Aqua grunts on a mission to Mt. Chimney, to try to steal a meteorite from Professor Cozmo before Team Magma could do so. Though they do not obtain the meteorite, Shelly still considers the mission a success, since the meteorite is destroyed and therefore Team Magma could not use it either. She appears again in "Unfair Weather Friends", where she and a group of Aqua grunts take the staff of the Weather Institute hostage to obtain their data on Groudon and Kyogre. However, their plans are thwarted by Magma agent Brodie, who makes off with the data himself. Shelly's final appearance is in "Gaining Groudon" and "The Scuffle of Legends". She sneaks onto Team Magma's base disguised as a Magma grunt and frees Kyogre from the cargo container, allowing Team Aqua to control it with the Red Orb. She is present during the battle between Kyogre and Groudon.

Team Magma
 are the rivals of Team Aqua. They are a group of experts in the fields of geology and plate tectonics. Like Team Rocket, some rebels are Pokémon thieves, but Team Magma specializes in the field of Fire and Ground type Pokémon. Their goal is to catch and control the Legendary Pokémon Groudon so that their leader, Maxie, can raise the level of all the world's landmasses.

Voiced by: Keiji Fujiwara (Japanese), Marc Thompson (English)
Maxie is the leader of Team Magma. His goal is to wipe out the sea to create more land by using a volcano and Groudon. He is more misguided than truly evil, as he believes that his actions will benefit others. Maxie meets Ash in the episode "Gaining Groudon", and tells him of his plans. He also tells Ash about the Blue Orb, which could control Groudon, and with it in his hands, he could make life better for himself. Suddenly, Pikachu gets possessed by the Blue Orb. It controls Groudon, and a cataclysmic battle begins, resulting in Groudon's victory. Afterwards, Maxie thanks Ash, realizing that the land of Hoenn was perfect the way it is.

Voiced by: Yūto Kazama (Japanese), Greg Abbey (English)
A member of Team Magma, Tabitha first appeared in "A Three Team Scheme!", where he leads a group of Magma Grunts in an exploration of some ancient ruins on Dewford Island in search of the Cave of Origin. They also have a confrontation with Team Aqua. Owing to a dubbing error, he is mistakenly referred to as "Field Commander Harlan" during this episode, though his name is corrected in all subsequent appearances. Tabitha appears again in "The Spheal of Approval", where he and two Magma Grunts break into the Oceanic Museum to steal a rock sample owned by Captain Stern. Although Ash and his friends attempt to stop them, Team Magma successfully makes off with most of the sample. In "Fight for the Meteorite!", Tabitha leads a squad of Magma Grunts on a mission to Mt. Chimney, first stealing a meteorite from Professor Cozmo and then using it to power an experimental machine affecting the volcano. However, their plans were ultimately thwarted by Ash and Cozmo. His final appearances are in "Gaining Groudon" and "The Scuffle of Legends". His submarine accidentally picks up Ash and his friends while out on patrol, bringing them to Team Magma's base. He is present for the battle between Kyogre and Groudon.

Voiced by: Katsuyuki Konishi (Japanese), Andrew Paull (English)
A spy with Team Magma, known as The Man of a Thousand Faces or Brodie The Phantom Thief, Brodie debuts in the episode "Unfair Weather Friends", disguised as Millie, a scientist at the Weather Institute who is supposed to be collecting data on Groudon. Team Aqua tries to steal the data directly, unaware "Millie" is really Brodie. When Shelly threatens to harm Bart and the other scientists at the Institute, Brodie reveals himself as a Team Magma agent and escapes with the information the Institute had gathered on the Legendary Pokémon. Brodie also appears in "The Ribbon Cup Caper". He disguises himself as various people, including Officer Jenny, to steal the Ribbon Cup for the Hoenn Grand Festival. When confronted by the real Officer Jenny, Brodie willingly gives up the Ribbon Cup because upon closer inspection "it wasn't valuable enough," and flies away once again.

Team Galactic
, is the criminal organization of the Sinnoh region. Their goal is to catch and control the Legendary Pokémons that created the universe: Dialga of time and Palkia of space, so that their leader, Cyrus, can destroy the universe and create a new universe that will only be his own as an absolute god.

Voiced by: Kenta Miyake (Japanese), Sean Schemmel (English)
Cyrus is the leader of Team Galactic. His goal is to "create a new universe" in his own image, with himself as the God of that world. In his first appearance in "Losing it's Lustrous!", it is shown that he is a rich businessman who has made most of the buildings and libraries throughout Sinnoh. However, Ash, Cynthia and the others do not know that he is also the member of Team Galactic. In this episode, commander mars and his grunts raid the celestic town museum and Cyrus gestures to him to steal the lustrous orb but Team Rocket interference in between their plan and they steal that orb. He also reappeared in "Double Team Turnover!", where Cynthia's grandmother Carelina and Cyrus (he enacted that he was with him) has come in the celestic ruins to stop the Team Rocket to run out with the orb, but Commander Jupiter and Mars steal the orb successfully with the help of spear key and they ran out with the orb. In the end of this episode, it is revealed that Cyrus is not only the member of the team, he is the leader of the Team Galactic. He again appeared in "Saving the World from ruins!", where he monitoring the analysing process of mt.coronet in their headquarter and later he got angry when he learn from his commander Saturn via from commander Mars that Ash and his team are trying to stop their Mission in iron island and after their mission has been failed by Ash and his team, he gave ordered Mars to retreat from iron island. He reappear in "Unlocking the Red Chain of Event!", where he sat at his headquarter and saw that Saturn finally find the Gateway of Spear Pillar in the Mt.Coronet and in the end of the episode, he told Hunter J to start the capturing process of lake trio Pokémon Mesprit, Azelf and Uxie with the help of their galactic bomb. Following the episode "The Needs of the Three!", when Ash, Dawn and Brock had come to their headquarter through the power of lake trio, he revealed to them that Team Galactic is her creation and he is now going to create a new order of the universe and no-one can stop him. He appeared in "The Battle Finale of Legend!", where he ordered his commanders to capture Ash and his team. Later he went to the gateway of Spear Pillar along with his team and also with the Adamant orb and Lustrous orb and also the Lake Trio and when he finally reach to the Spear Pillar, he finally summon the Dialga and Palkia with the help of Adamant orb and Lustrous orb and also the Lake Trio. He then control them with power of red chain and told them to create a universe for him, so they create the universe for him and in between these Ash and his friends and Cynthia are able to free the Dialga and Palkia from his control with the help of lake trio and when the newly universe get sinking, he enters it and he says it is only him and after that Dialga and Palkia destroyed it.

Voiced by: Ken'ichi Ogata (Japanese), Mike Pollock (English)
Charon is the scientist of Team Galactic, who debuted in "Saving the World From Ruins!", he is not in a speaking role but he is watching the entire process of analysis of Mt. coronet. He is seen briefly in Team Galactic's base. Charon makes his first full appearance in "Gateway to Ruin!" along with Saturn where they try to find the gateway of Spear Pillar in Mt. Coronet. They find a gateway but not that gateway they are looking for. In the end, he told Saturn that gateway of Spear Pillar is somewhere in the Mt.Coronet. Charon appears along with Jupiter in "Unlocking the Red Chain of Events!", where he finally made the Red Chain and then set a trap for Looker to placing a wrong red chain for him and for this he destroy all the details of Team Galactic from the international police database. He again appeared in "The Needs of the Three!", where he managed to control the lake trio Pokémon with the help of the red chain. In "The Battle Finale of Legend!", where he is also went to the Spear Pillar along with Cyrus and other team members. Later he order the grunts to fire the red chain on that position where Dialga and Palkia will be appeared and with the help of red chain they finally control them. He is not arrested, unlike the other three Commanders at the end of the arc. He appears briefly in "Memories are Made of Bliss!" in Team Rocket's fantasy with all the other members of Team Galactic and in a flashback of the Arceus Chronicles, however he makes no physical appearance in the Arceus side story. He is often seen with a laptop computer and does much of the technical work for Team Galactic's plans, such as monitoring energy levels and other statistics. Compared to the other Galactic members, he is the most laid back and upbeat, which often causes one-sided squabbles between him and Saturn.

Voiced by: Akemi Okamura (Japanese), Marc Thompson (English)
One of the Commanders of Team Galactic, Saturn makes his first appearance at the end of "A Secret Sphere of Influence!" He, along with the other Team Galactic Grunts, comment that Jessie, James and Meowth did a lousy job at stealing the Adamant Orb for them, and framing Nando for the crime. Saturn's first speaking appearance is in "Journey to the Unown!" He manages to steal a cube that under the guard of the Unown of the Solaceon Ruins and brings it with him back to the Team Galactic HQ. Saturn appears again in "Enter Galactic!". He exposes the cube to the meteorites in Veilstone City, transforming it into the Spear Key. Later, he and a few Galactic Grunts go to steal the meteorites, but fails after battling with Brock in a match ending with a draw. He appears in "Losing Its Lustrous!" and "Double Team Turnover!", along with Cyrus, Jupiter and Mars. They steal the Lustrous Orb and Adamant Orb from the Celestic Town Historical Research Center. He reappears with Cyrus, Jupiter and Charon in "Saving the World From Ruins!" where he is put in charge of excavation of the Spear Pillar from Mt. Coronet. Saturn appears again in "Gateway to Ruin!", along with Charon, where they attempt to locate the ruins of Mt. Coronet. Saturn also appears "Unlocking the Red Chain of Events!", "The Needs of the Three!" and "The Battle Finale of Legend!", where he loses to Brock during the final battle. After Cyrus passes through the portal created by Dialga and Palkia he realizes that Cyrus is just using him and the other commanders to reach his own goals and cares little for those who serve him. Afterwards he is arrested along with Mars and Jupiter by Looker and states that Team Galactic was finished, miserable to the fact that they devoted themselves to a false cause. However, he and his fellow commanders were able to escape prison in the Arceus Chronicles side story as to bring Cyrus back from his dimension, completely ignoring the fact that Cyrus betrayed them. He along with the commanders' plans failed and were sent back to prison for good.

Voiced by: Rie Tanaka (Japanese), Lisa Ortiz (English)
One of the Commanders of Team Galactic, Mars makes her debut appearance in the anime in "Losing Its Lustrous!" She, along with Saturn, attempts to steal the Lustrous Orb from the Celestic Town museum. She also appears in "Double Team Turnover!", in which she informs Cyrus that the Red Chain project is nearing completion. Mars appears again in "Steeling Peace of Mind!" She brings the Spear Key to Iron Island, where she activates the ruins in the island to find the exact location of the Spear Pillar in Mt. Coronet. After failing to complete the task in "Saving the World From Ruins!", she attempts to blow up the island on Cyrus's orders, but she fails due to Riley and his Lucario. She later appears in "The Needs of the Three!" and "The Battle Finale of Legend!" After the disappearance of Cyrus, she becomes distraught and even tries following him, but is stopped by Saturn. The duo, along with Jupiter, are later arrested. They escaped prison again through unknown means in the Arceus Chronicles side story as to bring Cyrus back, forgetting that Cyrus betrayed his commanders. They failed and get sent back to prison for good.

Voiced by: Chinami Nishimura (Japanese), Eileen Stevens (English, Diamond and Pearl), Kira Buckland (English, Arceus Chronicles)
One of the Commanders of Team Galactic, Jupiter makes her debut appearance in the anime in "Double Team Turnover!", where she is the one to get the Lustrous Orb back from Team Rocket after they steal it from the Celestic Town Historical Research Center. She is later assigned by Cyrus to lead the capture squad for the Lake guardians, along with some assistance from Pokémon hunters. She also has a cameo appearance in "Saving the World From Ruins!" Jupiter's first major appearance is in "Unlocking the Red Chain of Events!", where she protects Charon at the Fuego Ironworks while he works on the Red Chain. She successfully captures Looker, Jessie and James and later encounters Ash and his friends for the first time. During their encounter, she notes her disgust that Mesprit, Azelf and Uxie had chosen Dawn, Ash and Brock as their protectors rather than herself, Saturn and Mars. She and Charon escape. Jupiter is present when Team Galactic's plans come to a head in "The Needs of the Three!" where she battles Ash and his friends again. In "The Battle Finale of Legend!", she guards the outside of the Spear Pillar. She is quickly captured by Cynthia and later arrested, along with Mars and Saturn. The three commanders were able to escape prison through unknown means during the Arceus Chronicles arc as to bring back Cyrus, while ignoring the fact that Cyrus used them for his own purposes and abandoned them. The commanders get sent back to prison following their defeat.

Team Plasma
 is the criminal organization of Unova region. Their goal is to catch and control the Legendary Pokémon Reshiram so that their leader, Ghetsis, can rule all over the world.

Voiced by (English): Bill Rogers
Voiced by (Japanese): Masaki Aizawa 
Ghetsis is the leader of Team Plasma. His goal is to take control the Legendary Pokémon Reshiram so that he can rule over the world. His team members and his grunts called him as "Lord Ghetsis" except Colress, who called him as "Mr. Ghetsis". He has a scepter in his hand where the Team Plasma logo is engraved (unlike the games, it does not interfere with the usage of Poke Balls). He debuted in "Team Plasma's Pokémon Power Plot!", where he was seen briefly contacting Colress via a hologram communicator. He and Colress discussed the current status of the Pokémon control experiment, and when Ash, his friends, and Looker approached Team Plasma's laboratory, Ghetsis ordered Colress to turn the experimental Pokémon loose on them. He appeared again, this time in person, in "Team Plasma's Pokémon Manipulation!". He was seen contacting Colress for an update on his Pokémon control experiment and after that he ordered Aldith to go with Colress for further testing. Later, Ghetsis spoke to several Team Plasma Grunts, who were spying on the excavations made at the White Ruins as well as looking for N and conducting the mysterious "Project G" and "Project F". Ghetsis reappeared in "Secrets From Out of the Fog!", where he was seen angry on Aldith to learn that he failed to capture N and later he discussed with Colress about their device. Following the episode, he was also seen in flashbacks to N's past, in which he raised N alongside Anthea and Concordia and wild Pokémon. In a later flashback, a ceremony held in N's Castle involving N and the Seven Sages was interrupted by Reshiram, infuriating him. In "Team Plasma and the Awakening Ceremony!", he appeared with his grunts in the White Ruins, so that he can start the ceremony for awakening Reshiram. N also warned him about the Reshiram and his anger but he didn't listen and told N that now he had a Pokémon controlling device so there is nothing to worry about. In "What Lies Beyond Truth and Ideals!", Ghetsis successfully summoned Reshiram and, with the help of Colress's machine, he took control of it. Despite turning it on his enemies, however, he lost control of Reshiram when Colress's machine was destroyed by Pikachu's Electro Ball and Reshiram's Fusion Flare. Ultimately, he was arrested by Looker along with the Colress and other team members.

Voiced by (English): Eli James
Voiced by (Japanese): Hiroki Tōchi
Colress is a scientist of Team Plasma. His goal is to discover the true way to draw out the strength of Pokémon. Colress debuts in "Team Plasma's Pokémon Power Plot!", conducting experiments with wild Pokémon with electromagnetic waves in an attempt to bring out their true strength. He plants one of his controlling devices on Ash's Pikachu, forcing him to fight his Trainer. However, Ash's encouragement allows Pikachu to fight against the EM waves, eventually causing the device to break and freeing Pikachu. Before he can gather further data, Team Rocket shows up, using one of their miniature robots to steal Colress's research data from his computer. Colress appears again in "Team Plasma's Pokémon Manipulation!", where it was revealed that he had upgraded his Pokémon-controlling machine with his remaining research data. The machine now fires a narrow energy beam which instantly brings any Pokémon it hits under Team Plasma's control. Using this machine, Colress takes control of a Haxorus and Iris's Dragonite. A Shadow Ball from Aldith's Liepard accidentally hits the machine, breaking it and freeing Haxorus and Dragonite from his control. Colress and the Plasma Grunts retreat. Colress appears briefly in "Secrets From Out of the Fog!" with Aldith, discussing Team Plasma's plans with Ghetsis on a videophone call. Colress appears again in "Meowth, Colress and Team Rivalry!", where he refuses Meowth's attempt to recruit him to Team Rocket. However, he offers to allow Meowth to participate in an experiment to increase his strength. Colress controls Meowth's mind with the experiment, but Jessie and James snap him out of it before escaping. Later, Colress is seen with his Grunts reporting to Ghetsis, who revealed information about the Light Stone to them. In "Ash and N: A Clash of Ideals!", Colress appears with the rest of Team Plasma to commence their operation at the White Ruins. While Aldith, Barret and many other Grunts ambush the workers at the site, Colress uses his perfected machine to seize control of the workers' Pokémon and turn them on their Trainers. In "Team Plasma and the Awakening Ceremony!", he also takes control of Pikachu again, forcing N to surrender the Light Stone to Team Plasma in exchange for Ash's safety. He appears again in "What Lies Beyond Truth and Ideals!", aiding Ghetsis in taking control of the awakened Reshiram. When Ash and Pikachu try to stop him, he uses his machine on Pikachu yet again. However, this time Pikachu fights against its control, and together with Reshiram destroy Colress's machine once and for all, thus freeing the controlled Pokémon. Colress along with Ghetsis and the other Team Plasma members are later arrested by Looker, thus bringing the team down.

Voiced by (English): Lori Gardner
Voiced by (Japanese): Akeno Watanabe
A member of Team Plasma, Aldith first appears in "Team Plasma's Pokémon Power Plot!", observing Colress's work with controlling wild Pokémon with radio waves. During the tests, she experiences some friction with the scientist in terms of their ultimate goals; while Aldith expected the results of the experiment to help Team Plasma's takeover of Unova, Colress was merely interested in unlocking the true strength of Pokémon. When Looker, Ash and his friends arrive, she orders her fellow grunts to hold them off until Colress's test subjects are battle-ready, at which point she leads a retreat to lure her foes into their observatory base. Aldith commands Colress's brainwashed wild Pokémon against the intruders, as well as Pikachu when Colress attaches a transmitter to its head. When Pikachu manages to overcome the brainwashing, Aldith reminds Colress about the situation. After Team Rocket's interference destroys Colress's machine, freeing the mind-controlled Pokémon, Aldith joins her teammates in retreat, using a self-destruct mechanism to destroy the observatory and get rid of the remaining evidence of their activity. She reappears in "Team Plasma's Pokémon Manipulation!", where once again monitors a mind-controlling experiment of Colress, this time on a Haxorus. When Team Rocket shows up in an attempt to steal Colress's mind-controlling device, a battle starts, where a Shadow Ball from Aldith's Liepard misses its target and accidentally hits the machine, freeing the controlled Pokémon and forcing Team Plasma to retreat. Aldith has a short appearance in "Secrets From Out of the Fog!", communicating with Ghetsis alongside Colress. She appears in "Meowth, Colress and Team Rivalry!" as part of Colress's security force at his latest lab. When Team Rocket appears, she, along with Barret and several other Grunts, chase the trio out into the woods. There, they are drawn into a trap and did not escape for some time. Aldith appears with the rest of Team Plasma for the beginning of their operation at the White Ruins in "Ash and N: A Clash of Ideals!" She appears in "Team Plasma and the Awakening Ceremony!" and "What Lies Beyond Truth and Ideals!" She—along with Ghetsis, Colress, and Barret—is arrested in the end.

Voiced by (English): Darren Dunstan
Voiced by (Japanese): Kensuke Satō
A member of Team Plasma, Barret first appears with two other grunts looking for N under Ghetsis's orders. Barret finds N when he uses a locator inside his briefcase and deduces the hidden location. With N found, Barret is beaten in battle by Ash and his friends, who escape with N. Barret becomes upset about not being able to capture N and leaves the forest. In "Meowth, Colress and Team Rivalry!", when Team Rocket hacks into Team Plasma's data, the trio imprison Barret, Aldith and the grunts while they run off with the data. However, Barret breaks them free. In "Ash and N: A Clash of Ideals!", he battles with Cedric Juniper's assistants' Pokémon with Colress's aid. In "Team Plasma and the Awakening Ceremony!", he tries to stop Ash and his Pokémon from saving the others using the ones Colress controls with his machine. He is arrested alongside Ghetsis, Colress, Aldith and the other Grunts in "What Lies Beyond Truth and Ideals!" by Looker, after Ghetsis' plan of using Reshiram failed.

Team Flare
, is the criminal organization in the Kalos region. Their goal is to catch and control the Legendary Pokémon Zygarde so that their leader, Lysandre, can destroy the world and recreate it with peace and beauty.

Voiced by: Hideaki Tezuka (Japanese), H.D. Quinn (English)
Lysandre is the leader of Team Flare, and the creator of Lysandre Labs. Lysandre is a calm, respected man, who works together with the scientists of his own laboratory, the Lysandre Lab. His goal is to create a beautiful and peaceful world as he think that the world is full of ugliness because in his opinion the humanity is out of control and the discipline is lost from the world. Despite his somewhat friendly behavior, deep down lies a dark and selfish man working with the criminal organisation he created that is Team Flare, to capture the two Zygarde cores. The Team Flare members are working in his Lysandre Lab. He debuted in "From A to Z!", where he was seen at his residence to receive information from Mable that he failed to capture the zygarde. At the end of the episode he and Xerosic watch the footage Bryony had sent of her encounter with Zygarde, and he becomes shock over discovering that Zygarde possesses a power that he and his Team Flare had previously been unaware of and he told xerosic to retrieve the Zygarde. He reappears in "Meeting at Terminus Cave!", where he and Xerosic watch the clear footage of Zygarde/Z1/Squishy 10% forme and his power when it merged with his cells and then he asked Xerosic where is Z2. He reappeared in "A Meeting of Two Journeys!" for a short time, where he was seen in talking with Alain about the current status of Mega Evolution energy. Following capturing of Z2 in "An Explosive Operation!" he seen the capturing process of Z2 along with Xerosic but when Aliana and Mable had failed to capture Z2 because the interference of Team Rocket, he ordered Alain with the help of Xerosic to help them to capture the Z2 and with the help of Alain, Aliana and Mable capture the Z2 successfully. He appeared in "Championing a Research Battle!", where he and xerosic are talking among themselves that they can now move forward to the final stage of their mission. In "A Full Strength Battle Surprise!", he again appeared for a short time, where he received information from Xerosic that their experiment have got great success from their expectation, then he told Xerosic to continue their experiment and make sure that it will be fully operational. He again reappear in "Kalos League Passion with a Certain Flare!", where he was seen interested in Ash and his Greninja and then he is went to meet Ash and there he learn about the special power that only Ash and his Greninja have and that is called "Bond Phenomenon". After he learnt about that power he ask Ash to make a promise to him that they will meet again. In "Finals not for the Faint-Hearted", he is watching the Kalos league final battle between Ash and Alain and he is seen happy when he saw that Ash has some flying Pokémon. In "Down to Fiery Finish", He smiles when he saw Ash's Greninja change because of that special power which is called "Bond Phenomenon" and later Team Flare is able to take control of blue-core Zygarde referred to as "Z2" with the use of their Mega Evolution energy control system created by Xerosic. After that Z2 becomes Red Zygarde 50%forme and then he ordered Red Zygarde to attack the Lumiose City with his red vines and destroy everything in the city. In "A Towering Takeover", he ordered Celosia to capture Ash and bring him to her. After capturing Ash with his Greninja and his other Pokémon, he told Ash that he was the one of the chosen one of the new world which he is going to make. In "Coming Apart at the Dreams!", he wanted to take control Ash and his Greninja with the same energy that they used to control Zygarde so that he can use their bond phenomenon for his service but they fought back because of their strong bond and after he realized that Ash and Alain (when he realized that Lysandre fooled him) wouldn't listen to them anymore and they are trying to stop him, he start the Pokémon battle against Ash and Alain. In "The Right Hero for the Right Job!", he continues his battle with Ash and Alain but Ash's Pokémon are defeated one by one by his Mega Gyarados and when he almost defeat them, his former companion Malva has come in between their battle to support Ash & Alain and also to stop him because he realized that Lysandre's ambition is dangerous for the entire world and meanwhile, Bonnie and Clemont are able to free both the Zygarde from their control and he is shocked as well as entertained to see it. In "Rocking Kalos Defenses!", his Mega Gyarados are defeated by Ash's Pikachu & Greninja and Alain's Mega Charizard but he is still said them that he will recreate the world and then he jumped out from the prism tower. He appeared in "Forming a More Perfect Union!" where he came and gave the power back to the giant rock which was almost destroyed by Ash and his friends and now he want to stop them so that no one can stop him from going to the sundial in Anistar city for the finishing part of his plan but blue-core Zygarde referred to as "Z2" and the red-core Zygarde referred to as "Squishy" both of them fuse into Zygarde Complete Forme and defeat Lysandre, and he perishes after the giant rock is destroyed.

Voiced by: Tsuguo Mogami (Japanese), Abe Goldfarb (English)
Xerosic is a scientist of Team Flare who debuted in "From A to Z!". He is first seen at Lysandre Lab, receiving information that both Mable and Celosia had failed in their missions to capture Zygarde Cores(Z1 & Z2) respectively. He then informs them that Aliana and Bryony would now take on the capturing missions as well. At the end of the episode, he and Lysandre watch the footage Bryony had sent of her encounter with Zygarde, and he becomes excited over discovering that Zygarde possesses a power that he and Team Flare previously been unaware of. He reappears in "Meeting at Terminus Cave!", when he track the location of Zygarde/Z2 with the help of their tracking device he ordered Aliana and Mable to capture the Z2. At the end of the episode when he and Lysandre seen the clear footage of Zygarde/Z1/Squishy 10% form when it merged with cells, he told the Lysandre that the study of Zygarde's powers is still needed and when Lysandre ask him about Z2 he told him that they are searching the Z2 but it will take just a matter of time. In "A Meeting of Two Journeys!", Xerosic travels to a remote island to test a prototype weapon with the use of Zygarde Cells and Mega Evolution energy, that causes the trees on the island to bloom red flowers and unleash vines throughout the island. Later he informed Lysandre that their experiment has been successful. Following Z2's capture in "An Explosive Operation!", Xerosic is often seen monitoring Z2 and his capturing process, but when it will failed by Aliana and Mable because the interference of Team Rocket, he became angry and at the moment, when Lysandre asked him who could help us, then he summon Alain with the help of Lysandre order, Alain, Aliana and Mable successfully capturing Z2. In "Unlocking Some Respect!", he appeared for a short time, where he conducting an experiment on Giant Rock(which Lysandre came up with), with the use of Z2's power. He again appeared in "Championing a Research Battle!", where he and Lysandre are talking among themselves that they can now move forward to the final stage of their mission. In "A Full Strength Battle Surprise!", he continues that prototype weapon experiment in forest that somewhere located in the Kalos and this time their result of their experiment has much better than before and also far from their expectation because this time the vines has spread faster and the numbers of vines has much higher than before and also their strength is now become incredible and after that he inform Lysandre about all of this. He again reappear in "Kalos League Passion with a Certain Flare!", where he came with his grunts in the lumiose gym, and he reported Lysandre that he is now taking control of centre Lumiose because the gym is off for the duration of league so it was easy to take control it and later, he gave the order to his grunts to set-up the machine that he was created for their plan. In "Down to the Fiery Finish!", he ordered his team members to Start the process of controlling Z2 with the use of his creation called Team Flare's Mega Evolution energy control system, and finally they control Z2. After that Z2 turns as Red Zygarde 50% forme and he unleashes his red vines throughout the Lumiose City. In "Coming Apart at the Dream", Xerosic remains in the Lumiose Gym, overseeing Team Flare's operation, and when Z2 captured the Z1 with his red vines, he then fired the Mega Evolution Energy with which they have also control Z2 and then Z1 have also come under their control and he also turned as Red Zygarde and immediately he told Lysandre about it. In "The Right Hero for the Right Job", when Clemont and Clembot are enter the Gym to stop the functioning of their control system, he start the Pokémon battle against Clemont in the gym, but he lost the battle and then he was ejected from the gym after Clembot infiltrate their control system. In the universally hated episode, "Facing the Needs of the Many", he came back after he ejected from the gym by Clermont and Clembot and now he is in the process of creating Team New Flare so that he can Find every Zygarde cells around the world and provide Zygarde complete form because he wanted to make Lysandre's ambition become true and when Ash and Greninja wanted to stop him, he suddenly attack them and kidnap Clemont so that he can use his scientific knowledge in his plan but when Clemont refuse to work with him, he use his Mega Evolution energy control system that he previously used in Zygarde to control him. Once Ash, Serena and Bonnie arrive in his helicopter, he orders Clemont to capture them but However, Clemont had placed a microchip on the side of his head beforehand to prevent himself from being controlled. When he saw his plan failed, he became angry and start battle against Ash and Clemont, but loses. He then attempts to escape by jumping out of his helicopter, but is grabbed by Clemont's Aipom Arm. After the helicopter lands, he is arrested by Officer Jenny.

Voiced by: Karin Nanami (Japanese), Jessica Paquet (English)
Celosia is a member of Team Flare who debuted in "From A to Z!" She is first seen leading a group of Team Flare Grunts to recapture Z1/Squishy. She manages to find the Zygarde Core, but thanks to Ash, his friends, and Sawyer's interference, she is unable to retrieve it. When she later informs Xerosic of what had happened, he tells her that Bryony has been tasked with capturing the Core as well. The following night, Celosia leads yet another group of Grunts in an attempt to capture the Core, but with Ash and Sawyer covering Serena, Clemont, and Bonnie's retreat, she is once again unsuccessful. She reappeared in "Meeting at Terminus Cave!", teaming up with Bryony to retrieve the Core in Terminus Cave. After a prolonged struggle in the cave with Ash, His friends and Zygarde 10% form, during which Team Rocket interferes as well, Team Flare is forced to retreat, as they are unable to defeat Ash's Greninja. In "A Cellular Connection!", she, along with Bryony and several Grunts, monitor sensors to find Z1/Squishy, and order two Grunts to watch Ash and his friends. Later, the sensors catch energy waves coming from Z1/Squishy and Z2, and manage to determine Squishy's location. However, they are unable to came in time and lose sight of Squishy. Celosia appears again in "A Towering Takeover!", during Team Flare's attack on Lumiose City, where she allows his grunts to capture Ash and Pikachu by the order of their leader Lysandre. In "Coming Apart at the Dream!", she is seen at the Lysandre Lab Control Room with Mable, where the two see the helicopter containing Serena, Mairin, Professor Sycamore, and Team Rocket, nearing their hideout through their security cameras. In "The Right Hero for the Right Job!", She goes to stop Serena, Professor Sycamore and Mairin so that they can't enter in their lab but thanks to Team Rocket she can't stop them and start the battle with Team Rocket. She continues battling with Mable in "Rocking Kalos Defenses!". However, the two members are quickly defeated and subdued in Team Rocket's net trap.

Voiced by: Sayuri Hara (Japanese), Laurie Hymes (English)
Mable is a member of Team Flare who debuted in "From A to Z!" She is first seen leading a group of Team Flare Grunts in Terminus Cave, where they fail to capture 50% Zygarde. Mable is later seen informing Lysandre and Xerosic of the failure of her mission. Mable briefly appears in "Meeting at Terminus Cave!" in a video call with Xerosic, where she and Aliana are ordered to head to Z2 after Team Flare discovers its location thanks to their sensors. She reappears in "An Explosive Operation!", where she, Aliana, and several Team Flare Grunts try to capture Z2. Despite having his camouflage abilities disabled, Z2 transforms into its 10% Forme and used its powerful attacks to defeat Team Flare. Mable takes part in a battle between Team Flare and Team Rocket, who also wants Z2. After a prolonged struggle with Team Rocket and Zygarde 50% form, Team Flare finally capture Z2 with the help of Alain. In "Coming Apart at the Dream", during Team Flare's attack on Lumiose City, she had been ordered to stay at the Lysandre Lab Control Room and later she and Celosia see a helicopter containing Serena, Mairin, Professor Sycamore, and Team Rocket nearing Lysandre Labs through their security cameras. In "The Right Hero for the Right Job", she tries taking down the helicopter, but is attacked by Hoenn champion Steven. She and several Team Flare Grunts then face Steven in battle. She appears again in "Rocking Kalos Defenses!", where she joins Celosia in her battle against Team Rocket. However, the two members are quickly defeated and subdued in Team Rocket trap.

Voiced by: Rinko Natsuhi (Japanese), Theresa Buchheister (English)
Aliana is a member of Team Flare who debuted in "From A to Z!" She is seen at Lysandre Labs with Bryony when Xerosic informs her that she would be tasked with capturing 50% Zygarde, which Mable had recently failed to accomplish. Aliana briefly appears in "Meeting at Terminus Cave!" in a video call with Xerosic, where she and Mable are ordered to head to Z2 after Team Flare finds its location thanks to their sensors. She reappears in "An Explosive Operation!", where she, Mable, and several Team Flare Grunts try to capture Z2. Despite having his camouflage abilities disabled, Z2 transforms into its 10% Forme and used its powerful attacks to defeat Team Flare, escaping them again. Aliana takes part in a battle between Team Flare and Team Rocket, who also wants Z2. After a prolonged struggle with Team Rocket and Zygarde 50% form, Team Flare emerges victorious and capture Z2 with the help of Alain. She appears again in "A Towering Takeover!", during Team Flare's attack on Lumiose City, where she guards the Prism Tower with Bryony and prevents Serena, Clemont, Bonnie, Clembot, and Blaziken Mask from entering. In "Coming Apart at the Dream!", she and Bryony battle against Clemont, Clembot, and Blaziken Mask, but both ended up getting defeated and are captured by Clembot, allowing Clemont and Clembot to enter Prism Tower.

Voiced by: Akane Fujita (Japanese), Emily Woo Zeller (English)
Bryony is a member of Team Flare who debuted in "From A to Z!", where Xerosic sends her to retrieve Squishy/Z1. She is later seen cornering Squishy, who transforms into its 10% Forme and force Bryony and her assistant Grunts to retreat. She reappears in "Meeting at Terminus Cave!", teaming up with Celosia to retrieve Squishy in Terminus Cave. After a prolonged struggle with Ash, His friends and Squishy/Zygarde 10% form, during which Team Rocket interferes as well, Team Flare is forced to retreat, as they are unable to defeat Ash's Greninja. In "A Cellular Connection!", she, along with Celosia and several Grunts, monitor sensors to find Squishy. Bryony and Celosia also order two Grunts to watch Ash and his friends. Later, the sensors catch energy waves coming from Squishy and Z2, and manage to determine Squishy's location. However, they are unable to came in time and lose sight of Squishy. She appears again in "A Towering Takeover!", during Team Flare's attack on Lumiose City, where she guards the Prism Tower with Aliana. In "Coming Apart at the Dream!", she and Bryony battle against Clemont and Blaziken Mask, but both are defeated and are captured by Clembot, allowing Clemont and Clembot to enter Prism Tower.

Team Skull
 is the criminal organization in the Alola region. Their goal is to steal Pokémon. They travel on Harley-Davidson bikes. They also made a cameo appearance in Ultimate Journeys watching Ash's homecoming Battle Royale match without any attempt to cause problems.

Voiced by: Yasuyuki Kase (Japanese), Evan Maltby (English)
Guzma is the leader of Team Skull. He is known for his violent behavior and his lack of sportsmanship, which is why he does unsportsmanlike conduct. Some fans consider him as a sore loser and he is only able to win against weak opponents but backs out if the opponent is too strong. Before he founded Team Skull, he was one of Melemele Kahuna Hala's students.  At one point, he lost to Hala's Hariyama and Kukui's Braviary. Since then, he vowed to be unbeatable without the use of Z-Moves. When Professor Kukui founded the Alola Pokémon League, he vowed to destroy it and defeat every single contestant. During the Manalo Conference, when he defeated Lana and her Primarina with his Golisopod, he called her a dud, to which Akala Kahuna and referee Olivia intervened and told him to show respect, but he ignored her and left. During his match against Ash, his Golisopod told him to never give up until the end. He was ultimately defeated. Afterwards, Guzma appears to have a change of heart, having finally realised that he cannot run away from his problems and finish a battle that he started even if he has no chance of winning.

Voiced by: Saki Endō (Japanese), Jo Armeniox (English)
Plumeria is the admin of Team Skull. She has low tolerance for members being too reckless or disobedient. Plumeria is wise enough to back off if the odds of winning are not in the gang's favor. Plumeria is well aware of Guzma's past and his motivations of not being seen as a weak Trainer. She does assure Guzma that he tried his best even if he lost.

Voiced by: Takaaki Uchino (SM001-SM011); Toru Sakurai (SM024–present) (Japanese), Billy Bob Thompson (English)
Tupp is a member of Team Skull. He harbors a grudge against Illima, as Illima is more popular than Tupp, and was made an outcast in the process. Because of this, he joined Team Skull to regain his recognition. Despite being a member of Team Skull, Tupp is selfish as he abandons his teammates in favor of getting a Z-Crystal, while telling his Salandit to focus on the job, only to fail the trial. He is also not bright as he thought that a male Salandit can become a Salazzle (unaware that only female Salandit can evolve into Salazzle).

Voiced by: Madoka Asahina (Japanese), Lori Phillips (English)
Rapp is a member of Team Skull. She seems to look up to Tupp as a leader, if Guzma is not around and is a yes-lady to Tupp. Rapp is also interested in cute Pokémon such as Team Rocket's Meowth.

Voiced by: Soshiro Hori (Japanese), Jake Paque (English)
Zipp is a member of Team Skull. Much like Rapp, he also agrees with Tupp and looks up to him as a leader when Guzma is not around. He appears to be the least evil of the group as he agreed to take his ill Garbodor to the Pokémon Center upon Ash's suggestion.

Macro Cosmos

Voiced by (Japanese): Kenichirou MatsudaVoiced by (English): Barron Bass
Chairman Rose is the chairman of the Macro Cosmos conglomerate. He first appears in Wyndon Stadium, congratulating Leon after defeating Raihan in battle. His true colours are later revealed, when he summons Eternatus in an attempt to restore Galar's Dynamax energy, which is set to run out in a millennium from the present. Rose also stated that he himself coined the name Eternatus. He later challenges Ash, and he initially has the upper hand, but after Ash's Riolu evolved into Lucario, he was defeated. He was last seen on a helicopter with his secretary Oleana, but it gets hit by an Eternabeam from Eternatus (in its Eternamax form). After these events, his whereabouts are unknown, although Leon is tracking him down.

Voiced by (Japanese): Atsuko YuyaVoiced by (English): Jennifer Losi 
Oleana is Rose's secretary and the vice president of his company (she is also in charge of its day-to-day operations). She takes her job seriously, and is 100% devoted to Rose, even to the point that she accompanies him when he goes out. Her true colours are revealed when she tries to block Goh from reaching Ash with a battle, using her Milotic against his Raboot. Milotic initially has the upper hand (given the fact that Water types can easily defeat Fire types), but Goh developed a strategy to defeat it whereupon Raboot would use Ember from multiple angles in the ceiling. In doing so, it evolves into Cinderace, and Goh commands it to use its new move: Pyro Ball. The attack successfully KOs Milotic, thus defeating Oleana. She is later seen with Chairman Rose on a helicopter, observing the Darkest Day in fear. Like Rose, her whereabouts are unknown after the helicopter gets hit by Eternabeam.

Other antagonists

Voiced by (English): Shannon ConleyVoiced by (Japanese): Takako Honda
J was a ruthless and cruel Pokémon hunter around Sinnoh who captured and stole Pokémon to sell them on the black market to her clients for money. She is extremely ruthless and doesn't care about the well-being of others, even her henchman and her clients. She became angry when her clients decided to end their deal and decided to never work for those who she considered "Contract Breakers". After capturing the Lake Trio for Team Galactic, her airship was struck by Future Sight causing it to crash and to sink into Lake Valor, leaving the fate of J, her crew, or any of the Pokémon on board her ship unknown. 

Voiced by (English): Daniel J. Edwards (Sun and Moon, episodes 43-132), Ryan Nicolls (137 until the end of Sun and Moon series), Kaiji Tang (Journeys)
Voiced by (Japanese): Mitsuaki Madono
Faba is a skeptical person, who has his doubts in others. In addition, Faba is also grouchy, and slightly pessimistic on progress of others and showing hostility when he angrily throws Ash's Rowlet after he mistakenly takes it instead of Nebby who manages to Teleport. Faba is also sneaky to convince the Team Rocket trio to serve as bodyguards in Aether Paradise, but strictly orders them whenever their leader has visitors such as Ash and the group. Like the other recurring villains aside from the Team Rocket trio, Faba has a sinister side similar to Giovanni's who has his own evil ambitions and his plans to capture Nebby and other Ultra Beasts for his experiments identical to Xerosic's before being freed by Ash and the group and leading its evolution to Cosmoem. After being rejected by a Nihilego, which ends up possessing his boss instead, Faba regrets his actions. After Nihilego is defeated, he becomes much nicer, apologizing to Ash and his friends for his sinister ambitions. However, he still retains his pride of the inventions he makes. He can also sometimes fall for his own traps – once, he made a trap with adhesive to capture a Pheromosa and got stuck in it. Another scientist suggested he take his clothes off, he gets out then walks away in his underwear in embarrassment.

Voiced by: Kiyomitsu Mizuuchi (Japanese), H.D. Quinn (English)
Viren is the selfish and greedy owner of Rainbow Happy Resorts, building the resorts throughout Alola by illegal means and avoiding any punishments from the crimes he committed (most notably damaging private property). He tried to build a resort by buying Kiawe's family farm, but failed and him and his underlings were sent to jail for blocking the streams and other illegal things just to buy the family farm. He had an Electivire when he went up against Kiawe's Marowak. Kiawe battled Viren twice, the first time he was defeated, but he defeated Viren in the second attempt. He reappeared twice, and his most recent appearance, he was trying to build a resort, with no illegal means, but the work was interrupted by an Ultra Beast, Stakataka. After the Stakataka had been dealt with, he gave up on building a resort and went to build his own stadium.

Supporting characters

Voiced by (English): Veronica Taylor (4Kids) Sarah Natochenny Voiced by (Japanese): Masami Toyoshima
Delia Ketchum is caring toward her son, Ash, always reminding him to do his best. She is smart and intelligent yet ditzy and naive and talented, having won a beauty pageant and cooked a dish so popular that elite chefs at the Indigo Plateau have asked for its recipe. She has a Mr. Mime housekeeper nicknamed , who helps her with chores and is also rather adept in battle. Ash's journey to the Alola region begins when Mimey wins Ash and Delia some plane tickets there.

Voiced by: Yumi Tōma (Japanese), Megan Hollingshead (Season 6), Karen Neill (Season 7 and 8), Klara Leopold (Season 9)
Caroline is the mother of May and Max and wife of Norman. She asks May to be with Max and protect him.

Voiced by: Jūrōta Kosugi (Japanese), Dan Green (English)
Norman is the father of May and Max, the husband of Caroline, and the Petalburg Gym Leader. Early on in the show, Ash went to Petalburg Gym to challenge the Gym Leader, with May. Here, he meets May's younger brother, Max, along with their parents, where Norman reveals himself as Gym Leader. Because Ash did not have three Pokémon on hand (he only had Pikachu), Norman could not accept Ash's Gym Challenge. However, Norman and Ash decided to have an exhibition match. Shortly after, he uses a Vigoroth to save May's Torchic from Team Rocket. Later, Ash wins a Balance Badge from Norman in "Balance of Power".

Voiced by: Makoto Tsumura (Japanese), Sarah Natochenny (English)
Johanna is the mother of Dawn and a former Pokémon Coordinator, having won the Ribbon Cup and the title of Top Coordinator after winning the Sinnoh Grand Festival when she was younger. Dawn grew up inspired by her achievements and decided to follow in her footsteps, wanting to become a great Coordinator as well. When Dawn leaves on her journey, Johanna gives her the first Contest Ribbon she received as a good luck charm. Johanna watches all of Dawn's Contests on television along with her Glameow. She also has newspaper articles about Dawn's victories and pictures of her competing in Contests and the Hearthome Collection in her living room. Although she keeps track of Dawn's journey, she doesn't like to get too involved, telling Dawn she would be better off relying on her friends and her Pokémon instead of her mother, and to use her losses as a learning opportunity. She teaches other Coordinators from her house. She briefly appears in Journeys, where Johanna was being interviewed on a talk show as well as promoting a Contest in Eterna City.

Voiced by: Yūichi Nakamura (Japanese), Nicholas DiMichele (English)
N can hear the inner voices of Pokémon and believes that humans are using them for their own gain. Ghetsis raised N along with Anthea and Concordia, making them believe Pokémon cannot be equals with humans unless they are released from all Poké Balls. A short time before the present, N was about to be crowned King of Team Plasma in Ghetsis' plan to use N's pure-hearted desire to save Pokémon to summon Reshiram and enslave it. However, the attempt backfired, leaving Team Plasma's castle destroyed by Fusion Flare. N, along with Anthea and Concordia flee to a secluded abandoned castle, where they spend their time tending to mistreated  Pokémon.

Voiced by: Hitomi Nabatame (Japanese), Erica Schroeder (English)
Grace is Serena's mother and a Rhyhorn racer. She makes her debut appearance in "Kalos, Where Dreams and Adventures Begin!", where she has her Fletchling. In "A Battle of Aerial Mobility!", Grace wished Serena good luck on her journey as her daughter sets off to Lumiose City to get her first Pokémon. She appears again in "Giving Chase at the Rhyhorn Race!", where she tells Serena to continue traveling with Ash and the others, saying that it would be good for her. Grace watches Serena competing in the Dendemille Town Pokémon Showcase on television in "Performing with Fiery Charm!" Grace appears in "Master Class is in Session!" and "Performing a Pathway to the Future!" to watch Serena's Master Class Showcase in person. After watching the Showcase (which results in Serena's loss), Grace tells Serena that she did her best in the Showcase, which is all what matters. Grace appears again in "The First Day of the Rest of your Life!", watching Serena's performance along with Shauna and Jessie. After the performance Grace asks of Serena to have some confidence, reminding Serena is her daughter.
 / 
Voiced by: Kensuke Satō (Japanese), Tom Wayland (Season 17 and the first half of season 18 ending in "Confronting the Darkness!"), Wayne Grayson (Season 18 starting from "The Moment of Lumiose Truth!" onwards)
Meyer is the father of Clemont and Bonnie and the manager of an electrical appliance store. Meyer first appeared as Blaziken Mask in "Lumiose City Pursuit!" His Blaziken saves Ash from falling off of the Prism Tower. The two then left by leaping away. He appears as Meyer for the first time in "Clemont's Got a Secret!", reminding Clemont that strictness is not enough for one to become a Trainer and unintentionally reveals to Ash and Serena that Clemont is also the Lumiose Gym Leader. Moved by Clemont announcing he is to travel with Ash and Serena to become stronger, Meyer hugs his two children and calls for a party to celebrate, allowing them to continue on their journey. In "Mega-Mega Meowth Madness!", Meyer, as Blaziken Mask, uses his Blaziken to save Ash, Pikachu, Serena, Clemont, Bonnie, Professor Sycamore, and Chespin from Team Rocket's mecha before the two leap away. In "Confronting the Darkness!", Blaziken mask has his Blaziken defeat Team Rocket, who had just stolen Clembot, the interim Lumiose Gym Leader, and the Dark Clembot, a duplicate of Clembot who tries to frame Clembot. In "The Moment of Lumiose Truth!", Meyer watches the Gym Battle between Ash and Clemont. In "Garchomp's Mega Bond!", he reappears as Blaziken Mask. His true identity is discovered and known by Professor Sycamore by the end of the episode. In "Down to the Fiery Finish!", doing some work on a roof with Clembot listening to the match with Alain and Ash on the radio. He reappears as Blaziken Mask in "A Towering Takeover!", where he joined the fight against Team Flare. In "Coming Apart at the Dreams!", he saves Bonnie from some rampant vines that are being generated by Z2. He then tries to stop her from confronting Squishy. He reappeared in "The Right Hero for the Right Job!", where he protects Bonnie from a rampant and mind-controlled Squishy. In "Rocking Kalos Defenses!" and "Forming a More Perfect Union!" Blaziken Mask and Blaziken are among those trying to stop the Giant Rock. After an attack, his secret identity is accidentally revealed to his children. In "Battling With a Clean Slate!", Meyer helps repair the Lumiose Gym. Later, he referees the Gym battle between Clembot and Alvin.

Voiced by: Kenta Miyake (Japanese), Sean Reyes (English)
Abe is the father of Mallow and the owner of the Aina's Kitchen. He first appears in "A Seasoned Search!" Abe appears in "Mallow and the Forest Teacher!", where Mallow runs away into the forest after having had enough and encounters the same Oranguru that Abe did in the past. Abe later found Mallow and they made up. He appears in 112th episode of Ultimate Journeys.

Voiced by (English): Bobbi Hartley
Voiced by (Japanese): Sayaka Kinoshita
The mother of Lillie and Gladion, Lusamine is the leader of the Aether Foundation. She keeps doting towards her daughter Lillie, like messing around with her hair. She fuses with the Ultra Beast Nihilego, and starts acting like a child and kept telling her children to stay away from her. Once she finally diffuses with Nihilego from its defeat, Lusamine also becomes deeply emotional towards her children upon their reunion once more. She once was married to Aether Professor Mohn, who moved to Alola to commence his research on the Ultra Wormhole. In the episode ''The Secret Princess!'', it was revealed that Mohn was involved in an accident wherein he was sucked into an Ultra Wormhole during one of his experiments. A flashback in the episode revealed that he saw the Pokémon Magearna lying in the corner of an antique shop. He tried to bring it back to life for Lillie, but to no avail. When Lillie asked Lusamine about what happened to Mohn's Pokémon, she couldn't remember what happened because, according to Hobbes, she was in a state of shock about what just happened. When Tapu Fini engulfed Ash, Mallow, Lillie and Gladion in its mist, Mohn couldn't be found in the mist because, according to soon-to-be Island Kahuna Hapu, Mohn somehow survived the accident. She, alongside Lillie and Gladion, is currently on a quest to find Mohn and bring him home. Along with Gladion and Lillie, she returns to the show in person where she reunites with Mohn at Crown Tundra. Afterwards, the family alongside Ash, Goh and Chloe head off to Alola for their homecoming and Ash's Battle Royale match.

Voiced by (English): Cherami Leigh
Voiced by (Japanese): Kana Hanazawa
Chloe is a childhood friend of Goh. She is overly cautious and takes a realistic approach to life as she distance herself from making friends, except Goh and a couple of others, as she did not talk to Ash much. When she was little, Chloe liked Pokémon but started to dislike them and acted cold around them, except with the family Yamper at times, because she felt jealous as she did not like that they stole her attention from everyone around her. However, after realizing her behavior, Chloe not only overcame her jealously with Pokémon but also became closer with the family Yamper. Also, Chloe became more open about making friends as she has come to see Ash in that term and has grown to care about Pokémon again. After catching her first Pokémon, Chloe officially became a Pokémon Trainer and joins her friends on their research adventures. Chloe's Pokémon partner is a special female Eevee that is incapable of evolving. She later watched Ash's battle against Leon.

Voiced by (English): Megan Hollingshead (Season 1–6, 23 current); Michele Knotz (Season 9–13); Alyson Leigh Rosenfeld (Season 14–16); Kate Bristol (Season 17–19), Suzy Myers (season 20-22)Voiced by (Japanese): Ayako Shiraishi (EP002-EP229); Yuriko Yamaguchi (EP245-EP488; EP517-EP656); Kikuko Inoue (Temp. Replacement from EP491-EP516); Chika Fujimura (EP659-EP795); Chinatsu Akasaki (EP802–present)
"Joy" is the shared last name of the Joy family, in which most members are nurses. They mainly work in Pokémon Centers, but they also work in other locations. Brock, who claims to be able to tell the Joys just by minor appearance details (different-colored crosses on their hats; hair is slightly shorter; smile is wider; etc.), is infatuated with every Nurse Joy he meets, and often has to be restrained by a traveling companion. Although all of them look almost identical to each other, some do have different personalities, and a few even other occupations besides nursing. Multiple Joys are judges in Pokémon Contests. In the "Drifloon in the Wind" (Season 10, Ep28), there is a Nurse Joy who is married and has two daughters, who are called Marnie Frances Lynette and Paige Frances Lynnelle Joy and look exactly like their mother and want to grow up to be Nurse Joys like their mother. Pokémon: The Electric Tale of Pikachu manga author Toshihiro Ono cited her as one of his favorite characters to draw for the series, stating the reason as "because she's a girl".

Voiced by (English): Lee Quick (Season 1-7); Jamie Davyous Owens (Season 8); Emlyn Morinelli McFarland (Season 9–13); Emily Bauer (Season 14–16; Season 23); Saskia Maarleveld (Season 17-19), Samantha Moon (Sun and Moon series episodes 9 to 39), Martha Harms (Sun and Moon series 70-128)Voiced by: (Japanese): Chinami Nishimura (EP002-EP632); Chiaki Takahashi (EP663-EP795); Chiemi Ishimatsu (EP801–present)
"Jenny" is the shared last name of the Jenny family, in which most members are police officers and maintain the law and order in the Pokémon world and often oppose members of Team Rocket. The Japanese name, junsa (kanji 巡査, hiragana じゅんさ), means "police officer".

Voiced by (English): Lisa Adams (4Kids); Kayzie Rogers(TPCi)Voiced by (Japanese): Yumi Takada
Vivian Meridian is the main Pokémon Contest host of the Hoenn region and the older sister of Lilian Meridian.

Voiced by (English): Lisa Adams (4Kids); Kayzie Rogers (TPCi)
Voiced by: Akemi Okamura
Lilian Meridian is the main Pokémon Contest host for the Kanto region and the younger sister of Vivian Meridian.

Voiced by (English): Hilary ThomasVoiced by (Japanese): Tomoko Kawakami (DP001-DP095); Satsuki Yukino (DP106 onward)
Marian is the Pokémon Contest host for the Sinnoh region. She looks identical to Vivian and Lilian, though her relation to them is unknown. 

Voiced by (English): Mike Pollock (Season 6–8, Season 13)Voiced by (Japanese): Koichi Sakaguchi
Mr. Contesta is main judge of the three contest judges of Pokémon Contests. He is usually the first one to comment on the Pokémon, and the one who offers advice to the Coordinators. He is critical, but fair in his judgments.

Voiced by: Yoshinori Sonobe (Japanese), Darren Dunstan (4kids), Craig Blair (Season 9-12), Tom Wayland (Season 13) (English)
Mr. Sukizo is one of the three judges for Pokémon contests, alongside Mr. Contesta and Nurse Joy. His appearance resembles that of a male PokéFan, which may have served as inspiration for his design. In the English adaptation of the series, his phrase is "remarkable".

Voiced by: Nina Kumagaya (Japanese), Kerry Williams (English)
Casey is a Pokémon Trainer from New Bark Town in Johto. Being a fan of the Electabuzz baseball team, Casey likes yellow Pokémon with stripes. Ash belittled her team, claiming it was weak, making Casey furious to challenge him to a battle, which Ash wins. Team Rocket deceives Casey into battling Ash once more, claiming that his use of Charizard broke the rules. Team Rocket takes the opportunity to catch Chikorita and Pikachu, which makes Casey realize they fooled her. Ash and Casey defeat Team Rocket. Later, during the Bug Contest, Ash warns Casey she was pushing Chikorita too hard, though Casey ignores Ash. When Chikorita runs away, Misty scolds Casey, reminding her it is important to look after the Pokémon, rather than winning the Contest. Casey apologizes for pushing Chikorita so hard. Team Rocket arrives and kidnapped Ash and Pikachu. Casey let Chikorita know she is with it, which makes Chikorita evolve into a Bayleef to beat Team Rocket again and free Ash and Pikachu. After the Contest ends, Casey, who did not win, felt like a winner for having Bayleef on her side. Knowing that Casey loves yellow Pokémon with stripes, Ash gives away the Beedrill he caught in the Contest to Casey. Casey meets up with Ash and his friends again, with the help of her evolved Meganium catches another yellow striped Pokémon, Elekid. Casey did not compete in the Johto league as she was only able to obtain four Johto Gym Badges in contrast to Ash who had acquired eight badges at the time when Casey caught her Elekid.

Voiced by: Megumi Nakajima (Japanese), Eileen Stevens (English)
Lyra is a female trainer from Johto who joins Ash and friends from "An Egg Scramble! to "Bagged Then Tagged!" Lyra is based on the female player character of the same name in Pokémon HeartGold and SoulSilver. In "A Rivalry To Gible On", Lyra tries to make Dawn and Khoury a couple, but realized that she had feelings for Khoury.

Voiced by: Miho Hino (Japanese), Zoe Martin (English)
Angie is a girl who lives in Sinnoh. She is first seen in the episode when Ash, Brock, and Dawn, attended a Week-Long Summer School program for Pokémon Trainers. She showed her confident side by testing Monferno (as a test of the Summer Academy), ordering it to attack her to grow its power, while also leaving her in bruises. She served as the tomboyish rival/friend for Ash, even though she develops a friendship with him and has a crush on him later on. 

Voiced by: Kenji Nojima (Japanese), Chris Niosi (English)
He is a male trainer from Johto who joins Ash and friends from "An Egg Scramble! to "Bagged Then Tagged!" He, like Brock, wants to become a breeder someday.

Voiced by: Hisao Egawa (Japanese), Marc Thompson (English)
"Don George" is the name of the owners of  throughout Unova. Like the Nurse Joys and Officer Jennys, there are many Don Georges that are all identical, but having different colored collars and wrist bands.

Voiced by: Masayuki Kato (Japanese), Francis Kelly (English)
"Porter" is the name of the guides that work on the cruises that run through the Decolore Islands.

Voiced by: Minami Takayama (Japanese), Billy Bob Thompson (English)
Luke is a young Pokémon trainer and amateur filmmaker Ash, Iris, and Cilan meet with when they reach Nimbasa City. He uses his Zorua, Golett, and Leavanny to make films, and has Ash, Cilan, and Iris help him finish his latest film. He later joins them in signing up for the Don Battle tournament, using his Larvesta to reach the semi-finals.

Voiced by: Mikako Komatsu (Japanese), Zoe Martin (English)
Mairin is a Pokémon trainer and companion of Alain. Mairin is a cheeky person, who always wants to experience adventure. Accompanied by her Chespin nicknamed , Mairin tries to cheer Alain up at times (who usually dismisses her attempts). Mairin is, at times, confused, mixing that she can Mega Evolve, rather than her Pokémon. Mairin is also angry when Alain leaves her, but when he is in danger, she tries her best to protect him, even if it means at the cost of her life. After Alain asked her to go back, claiming she is just a burden to him, Mairin is greatly depressed, especially after Chespie gets ill when it is affected by a strange green light. Mairin admires both her best friend Alain, even when they have their fallouts, and her close friend Serena a whole lot. Mairin also makes a cameo in Journeys watching Alain's match against Leon, only to get upset when Alain lost the match. She would later watch Ash's battle against Leon with Professor Sycamore and Alain.

Voiced by (English): Mike Liscio Voiced by (Japanese): Yudai Chiba
Ilima is a graduate student from the Pokémon school in Alola and is currently studying abroad in Kalos. Although he did compete in the Kalos League, it is implied that he did not win, prior to his debut. Even as a child, Ilima was considered to be one of the most popular students there, much to Tupp's annoyance, and was also crowned "Pokémon School Prince". Ilima specializes in Normal-type Pokémon consisting of Eevee (who chose to not evolve as to use the Eevium Z-Crystal), Smeargle and a Kangaskhan that can Mega-evolve. Within his debut appearance, he was visiting the school he studied at and met Ash and Lillie. While Ash and Ilima were about to battle, they had to scare off Tupp and his fellow Team Skull grunts who were there for vengeance. Later on, Ilima competed in a local ping-pong tournament and won before he headed back to Kalos. After a long absence, he came back to Alola in time to compete in the Manalo Conference and even defeated most of the Skull grunts (including Plumeria) at the cost of his Eevee getting injured in the Battle Royal. Everyone thought that because of his skills and having a large fanbase, he was deemed the favorite to win the Alola League, only for Ilima to fail in his match against Guzma. Though he stayed to watch the rest of the league and Ash being crowned the Alola Champion, it is not known what became of him during the Guzzlord attack or if he watched Ash's battle against Kukui in an exhibition match.

Voiced by: Ryoko Shiraishi (Japanese), Anjali Kunapaneni (English)
One of the Chasers for Project Mew, Danika is portrayed as both welcoming and friendly. She is a water-type trainer as she owns an Azumarill, a Jellicent and Rapid Strike Urshifu. She first appeared in the show when Gary contacts her after obtaining a Moltres feather, with the help of Ash and Goh. When Goh meets Danika in person, Danika explains to Goh how Project Mew operates and provides him with various missions. Afterwards, she has appeared throughout the Project Mew missions monitoring the trainer's progress. She successfully got to meet Mew in person alongside Quillon, Goh, Gary and Horace.

Voiced by: Hiroshi Kamiya (Japanese), Max Mittelman (English)
One of the Chasers for Project Mew, Quilldon is portrayed as a reserved and serious trainer. He is a dark-type trainer since he owns three dark-type Pokémon: Weavile, Honchkrow and Single Strike Urshifu. He first appears in the show monitoring Goh's proposed mission to catch an Alolan Ninetales. He has appeared throughout the Project Mew arc such as stopping poachers and the way they handle their Pokémon. He met Mew along with Danika, Gary, Goh and Horace.

Voiced by (English): A.J. BecklesVoiced by (Japanese): Takuto Yoshinaga
Hop is the younger brother of Leon, the Galar Champion and World Monarch. Unlike his game counterpart, he does not serve as a rival of Ash and his role in the Darkest Day arc was given to Goh. Hop was first mentioned by Sonia, who mentioned that Leon had to take care of his family and his younger brother which meant Leon did not have many friends aside from her. Hop would not debut until the Masters Eight Tournament where he meets Ash and Goh at Wyndon Stadium, while recognizing Ash as one of the Masters Eight members. Hop challenged Ash into a battle only to lose easily as Ash's Pikachu knocked out Hop's Wooloo with Iron Tail in one hit. Hop then revealed his identity and that he was testing to see if Ash was a worthy member of the Masters Eight. Afterwards, he sits throughout the tournament cheering for his older brother Leon, alongside Sonia. He later battles Bea while Leon referees the match. Hop's easy defeat against Ash was to serve as a reminder to fans as to why Hop would not have made his rivalry with Ash very convincing.

Other characters

Voiced by: Masami Toyoshima
Meowzie is a female Meowth whom Meowth of Team Rocket fell in love with when he was young and later joined the Meowth gang led by a Persian after being abandoned by her owner who is moving away and unable to afford to keep her.

Voiced by: Kenji Nojima (Japanese), Sean Schemmel (English)
A main character from Pokémon Chronicles and counterpart of Ethan. Jimmy is on his way to become a great Pokémon Master with his Typhlosion, so that he can help the kids in New Bark Town. He first appears in the first three episodes of the Pokémon Chronicles, called Raikou: The Legend of Thunder. He also cameoed in Journeys watching Lance's match against Diantha.

Voiced by: Kazusa Murai (Japanese), Kelly Davis (English)
A main character from Pokémon Chronicles and counterpart of Kris. Marina is an old friend of Jimmy's, and she battles to entertain, always making sure she puts on a good show. She also performs in dance routines with her Pokémon. Her favorite Pokémon are her Misdreavus nicknamed  and Croconaw nicknamed . Marina also appears in episode 10 of Diamond & Pearl as the poster girl for the Poketch, on the back of a magazine Dawn was reading. She later appears in episode 41 of Diamond & Pearl in a video of her doing a double contest appeal. She also appears in a cameo in Journeys watching Lance's match against Diantha.

Voiced by (English): Adam EzegelianVoiced by (Japanese): Kiyotaka Furushima

Ryuki is a Dragon-type trainer and runs the Kantonian Gym. Unlike the other Gyms in the previous regions, this one is an unofficial Gym. He only appears in one episode during Ash and his friends' visit to Malie City. Each of the trainers when participating in the Gym had to do a series of ninja related obstacle courses and face the trainers per floor to reach the top. Once done, they get to fight against Ryuki. Kiawe attempted to face off against Ryuki first only to lose easily due to his Alolan Marowak being too distracted by the loud music. Ash steps in and uses both Rowlet and Meltan to defeat Ryuki's Druddigon and Zweilous, earning a novelty badge with Ryuki's face on it.

References

Manga volumes
Ono, Toshihiro. Pokémon: Electric Pikachu Boogaloo Graphic Novel. VIZ Media LLC, April 5, 2000. 
Ono, Toshihiro. Pokémon: Surf's Up, Pikachu Graphic Novel. VIZ Media LLC, June 2000. 

 
Characters